= List of World Heritage Sites in Belgium =

Location of World Heritage Sites within Belgium. Red dots are cultural sites, the green dot is a natural site. Grand-Place, Major Town Houses of the Architect Victor Horta, and the Stoclet House are all in Brussels. Black dots indicate the Major Mining Sites of Wallonia (4 sites). Not shown are the Beguinages (13 sites), the Belfries of Belgium and France (56 sites, of which 33 are in Belgium) and the Funerary and memory sites of the First World War (Western Front), of which 43 are in Belgium.

The United Nations Educational, Scientific and Cultural Organization (UNESCO) World Heritage Sites are places of importance to cultural or natural heritage as described in the UNESCO World Heritage Convention, established in 1972. Cultural heritage consists of monuments (such as architectural works, monumental sculptures, or inscriptions), groups of buildings, and sites (including archaeological sites). Natural features (consisting of physical and biological formations), geological and physiographical formations (including habitats of threatened species of animals and plants), and natural sites which are important from the point of view of science, conservation or natural beauty, are defined as natural heritage. The Kingdom of Belgium accepted the convention on 24 July 1996, making its sites eligible for inclusion on the list.

Belgium has 16 sites inscribed on the list. The first sites to be added to the list were the Flemish Béguinages, the Grand-Place in Brussels and the lifts on the Canal du Centre, at the 22nd UNESCO session in 1998. The most recent inscription was the serial transnational site Funerary and memory sites of the First World War (Western Front), which is shared with France. The Sonian Forest, part of the 18-country site of the Ancient and Primeval Beech Forests of the Carpathians and Other Regions of Europe, is the only natural site in Belgium; the others are cultural sites, as determined by UNESCO's selection criteria. Belgium's six transnational sites also include the Belfries of Belgium and France, shared with France, the Architectural Work of Le Corbusier, shared with six other countries, the Colonies of Benevolence, shared with the Netherlands, and the Great Spa Towns of Europe, shared with six other countries. In addition, Belgium has 16 sites on its tentative list. Belgium has served on the World Heritage Committee twice.

== World Heritage Sites ==
UNESCO lists sites under ten criteria; each entry must meet at least one of the criteria. Criteria i through vi are cultural, and vii through x are natural.

* Transnational site

World Heritage Sites with location, year, UNESCO criteria, and other details
Site	Image	Location (province)	Year listed	UNESCO data	Description
Flemish Béguinages	Red brick buildings and a green lawn in front	several sites	1998	855; ii, iii, iv (cultural)	Béguinages (French) or begijnhoven (Dutch) are collections of small buildings used by Beguines. They were founded in the 13th century in the Flemish cultural region, comprising unmarried or widowed religious women who sought to serve God without retiring from the world. The list includes 13 béguinages: Bruges, Dendermonde, Diest, Ghent (Klein Begijnhof, Groot Begijnhof), Hoogstraten, Kortrijk, Leuven (Great Beguinage pictured), Lier, Mechelen (Groot Begijnhof), Sint-Truiden, Tongeren and Turnhout.
The Four Lifts on the Canal du Centre and their Environs, La Louvière and Le Roeulx (Hainaut)	River canal with a boat and a hydraulic lift, a red brick building in the background	Hainaut	1998	856; iii, iv (cultural)	The lifts on the Canal du Centre are a series of four hydraulic boat lifts, each one covering a change in level of around 15 m (49 ft) over a distance of 7 km (4.3 mi). They were constructed at the end of the 19th century and beginning of the 20th century and are still functioning. Originally serving as a connection between the river basins of the Meuse and the Scheldt to support transport, in particular coal, the channel is now mainly used for leisure navigation.
La Grand-Place, Brussels	The Grand-Place, surrounded by historic buildings, with the central part decorated with a floral carpet. Several tourists around.	Brussels	1998	857; ii, iv (cultural)	The Grand-Place, the central square of the City of Brussels, is surrounded by a collection of buildings that reflect the evolution of a highly successful mercantile city. Most buildings were constructed after the end of the 17th century, following the Bombardment of Brussels by the French in 1695. The 15th-century Town Hall was partially spared and represents a masterpiece of the Brabantine Gothic. Most buildings are in the Baroque style, while the King's House, housing the Brussels City Museum, was restored in the 19th century in the neo-Gothic style.
Belfries of Belgium and France*	The belfry of the Cloth Hall in Ypres, Belgium	several sites	1999	943bis; ii, iv (cultural)	This site comprises a total of 56 belfries, bell towers of civic buildings instead of churches, that were built between the 11th and 17th centuries in different architectural styles: Romanesque, Gothic, Renaissance, and Baroque. They symbolized the wealth and the influence of the towns. In 1999, 32 belfries in Belgium were originally listed, and in 2005, the site was expanded to include the belfries in France and the belfry in Gembloux in Belgium. Some of the belfries include: Cathedral of Our Lady & Antwerp City Hall in Antwerp, St. Rumbold's Cathedral & City Hall in Mechelen, Belfry of Bruges, Belfry of Kortrijk, Cloth Hall in Ypres (pictured), Schepenhuis in Aalst, Belfry of Ghent, Oudenaarde Town Hall, St. Peter's Church in Leuven, St. Leonard's Church in Zoutleeuw, Belfry of Mons, Belfry of Thuin, Belfry of Tournai, and Belfry of Namur.
Historic Centre of Bruges	View of Bruges' city centre along a river	West Flanders	2000	996; ii, iv, vi (cultural)	During the Middle Ages, Bruges was one of the main commercial and cultural centres of Europe. A prominent feature of the city is a network of canals that played an important role in mercantile traffic. The medieval city plan has been well preserved, as well as several Brick Gothic buildings and architectural ensembles from other periods. In the 15th century, the city was the cradle of the Flemish Primitives, with wealthy patrons supporting painters such as Jan van Eyck and Hans Memling.
Major Town Houses of the Architect Victor Horta (Brussels)	House interior with a staircase decorated in the Art Nouveau style	Brussels	2000	1005; i, ii, iv (cultural)	Belgian architect Victor Horta was one of the pioneers of the Art Nouveau style. This site comprises four representative houses he designed in Brussels at the end of the 19th century: Hôtel Tassel (interior pictured), Hôtel Solvay, Hôtel van Eetvelde, and Maison & Atelier Horta. The houses demonstrate the novel aspects of the Art Nouveau style: use of steel and glass in construction, the use of curved lines in decoration, and the introduction of modern technical utilities.
Neolithic Flint Mines at Spiennes	Interior of an ancient mine with three shafts	Hainaut	2000	1006; i, iii, iv (cultural)	The flint mines at Spiennes are Europe's largest and earliest neolithic mines. Between the last third of the 5th millennium and the first half of the 3rd millennium, these mines were used to extract flint, a crucial material for stone tools. People used different extraction techniques, the most prominent being by digging shafts up to 16 m (52 ft) deep. Archaeological remains of tool manufacture have been found on site, illustrating a standardized production and highly skilled craftsmanship. The site is associated with the Michelsberg culture.
Notre-Dame Cathedral in Tournai	A church in the Romanesque and Gothic styles	Hainaut	2000	1009; ii, iv (cultural)	The church was built in the 12th century in the Romanesque style, while the 13th-century choir was rebuilt in the Gothic style. The architecture reflects the exchange of influences from France and Rhineland and the building can be seen as a precursor to the grand Gothic cathedrals of the following centuries.
Plantin-Moretus House-Workshops-Museum Complex	View of an old-style library with busts of people and one person reading	Antwerp	2005	1185; ii, iii, iv, vi (cultural)	The Plantin Press was one of the three leading printing centres in Europe, along with Paris and Venice. Established in the 16th century by Christophe Plantin who was succeeded by Jan Moretus, it was the most prolific European press of the late 16th century and operated until 1867. After that, the building was converted into a museum. The complex preserves the technical printing equipment, an extensive library (pictured), and business archives that document the cultural traditions during the Renaissance, Baroque, and Neoclassical periods.
Stoclet House	Exterior of a palace in the Secession style	Brussels	2009	1298; i, ii (cultural)	The Stoclet Palace was a private mansion built by architect Josef Hoffmann between 1905 and 1911 in Brussels, for banker Adolphe Stoclet. It is one of the best examples of the Vienna Secession style. The interior was lavishly decorated with works of prominent contemporary artists, including Gustav Klimt and Koloman Moser. The building was influential in the development of Art Deco and Modern architecture.
Major Mining Sites of Wallonia	Abandoned mining mechanization and a mine shaft in the background	Hainaut, Liège	2012	1344rev; ii, iv (cultural)	This site comprises four major coal mining complexes in Belgium, Grand-Hornu Bois-du-Luc, Bois du Cazier (pictured), and Blegny-Mine. While mining activities date back to at least the 17th century, the peak activity took place in the 19th and the second half of the 20th centuries when the mines were among the largest in Europe. Today, they are no longer operational. They preserve technical heritage of the industrial revolution related to mining and heavy industry. The mines were also a meeting point of different cultures, with workers coming from various European countries and Africa. The Bois du Cazier was the site of a major mining disaster in 1956.
The Architectural Work of Le Corbusier, an Outstanding Contribution to the Modern Movement*	A view of a modernist building with one facade with small windows	Antwerp	2016	1321; i, ii, vi (cultural)	This transnational site (shared with Argentina, France, Germany, Japan, Switzerland, and India) encompasses 17 works of Franco-Swiss architect Le Corbusier. Le Corbusier was an important representative of the 20th-century Modernist movement, which introduced new architectural techniques to meet the needs of the changing society. Maison Guiette (pictured) is listed in Belgium.
Ancient and Primeval Beech Forests of the Carpathians and Other Regions of Europe*	A forest with green beech trees	Flemish Brabant, Brussels, Walloon Brabant	2017	1133ter; ix (natural)	This transnational site, shared among 18 European countries, demonstrate the postglacial expansion process of such forests and exhibit the most complete and comprehensive ecological patterns and processes of pure and mixed stands of European beech across a variety of environmental conditions. The site was originally listed in 2007 and expanded four times. The Sonian Forest in Belgium was added to the list in 2017.
The Great Spa Towns of Europe*	A spa resort building with a fountain in front	Liège	2021	1613; ii, iii (cultural)	This transnational site comprises 11 spa towns in seven European countries where mineral waters were used for healing and therapeutic purposes before the development of industrial medication in the 19th century. The town of Spa (pictured) is listed in Belgium.
Colonies of Benevolence*	A white house with red roof and some shrubbery in front	Antwerp	2021	1555; ii, iv (cultural)	In the aftermath of the Napoleonic Wars in Europe, large sections of the population of the Low Countries were left impoverished. To address the social issues, the Society of Benevolence was founded in 1818 and, under the supervision of Johannes van den Bosch, constructed seven agricultural colonies for families, orphans, beggars, and retired military personnel. This approach was innovative with the combination of education, healthcare and (forced) labour to ensure the self-sufficiency of the colonies. Four colonies are listed, three in the Netherlands and Wortel (one of the houses pictured) in Belgium.
Funerary and memory sites of the First World War (Western Front)*	A military cemetery with several rows of tombstones with flowers in between	several sites	2023	1567rev; iii, iv, vi (cultural)	The transnational site, shared with France, includes 139 cemeteries and memorials on the Western Front of the First World War, 43 of which are located in Belgium. They include two Belgian military cemeteries, 26 Commonwealth military cemeteries and monuments, five French military cemeteries and monuments, two German military cemeteries, one Commonwealth-German military cemetery, one French-German military cemetery, one Canadian monument, one Irish monument, the crypt of the Yser tower, the Fort of Loncin, and two military plots. Lijssenthoek Military Cemetery is pictured.

== Tentative list ==
In addition to the sites inscribed on the World Heritage list, member states can maintain a list of tentative sites that they may consider for nomination. Nominations for the World Heritage list are only accepted if the site was previously listed on the tentative list. Belgium lists 16 properties on its tentative list.

Tentative sites with location, year, UNESCO criteria, and other details
Site	Image	Location (province)	Year listed	UNESCO criteria	Description
The historic centre of Ghent and two associated abbeys	A castle with prominent fortification walls on the river bank	East Flanders	2002	ii, iv (cultural)	The city of Ghent developed on the banks of the Lys river around two abbeys, Saint Bavo's and Saint Peter's, founded in the mid-7th century. The medieval historic nucleus of the city has been well preserved and comprises several prominent buildings from different periods. They include the Gravensteen (the castle of the counts of Flanders, pictured), Saint Nicholas Church, and the Belfry of Ghent, which is already listed as a World Heritage Site as a part of the Belfries of Belgium and France.
Historical core of Antwerp - from the Scheldt to the former ramparts of around 1250	Seven richly decorated houses with large windows on the town square	Antwerp	2002	ii, iv, vi (cultural)	The city of Antwerp developed along the river Scheldt. In the 13th century, a castle was built on the site of a previous fortification. Following silting of the Zwin channel in the 16th century, Antwerp grew in importance as a North Sea port and developed into a flourishing metropolis. Important sites include the Gothic cathedral (with the belfry already listed as a World Heritage Site as a part of the Belfries of Belgium and France.) and the Grote Markt (guild houses pictured).
University buildings of KU Leuven, the legacy of six centuries within the historic centre	Historic building of the university library with a prominent belfry behind	Flemish Brabant	2002	ii, iii, iv, vi (cultural)	The university in Leuven was founded in 1425. It underwent several reorganizations, the most recent being in 1968 when it split to Dutch- and French-speaking institutions. University buildings and colleges are integrated into the fabric of the city centre. Buildings span six centuries of history and reflect the changing needs of the schools. The University Library is pictured.
Royal Saint-Hubert Galleries	Interior view of a shopping gallery with several high-end stores on both sides	Brussels	2008	ii, iv (cultural)	The shopping arcades were built in 1847 following the designs of Jean-Pierre Cluysenaar. They are one of the most important examples of Neoclassical architecture in Belgium. The inspiration was drawn from the Italian Renaissance, but with the use of novel iron and glass technology, and from the examples in Paris. In turn, the Galleries were influential in the design of the Galleria Vittorio Emanuele II in Milan.
The architectural work of Henry van de Velde	A house with three gables	Brussels	2008	i, ii (cultural)	This nomination focuses on the works of the architect Henry van de Velde, one of the pioneers of Modern architecture. Villa Bloemenwerf (pictured) was built in 1895 and served as his residence and workshop until his departure for Germany. He also designed the interior and the furniture. Stylistically, the villa draws inspirations from the contemporary examples from England and from Art Nouveau but already indicates the development of subsequent styles. Eventually, this nomination aims at including van de Velde's buildings from several European countries.
Palace of Justice	A large palace with a prominent dome and renovation scaffolds visible	Brussels	2008	i (cultural)	The building was designed by the architect Joseph Poelaert in an eclectic style, drawing inspiration from Greco-Roman and Gothic architecture. Construction of the massive building begun in 1866 and concluded in 1883, when it was one of the largest buildings constructed in the 19th century. It was badly damaged at the end of World War II but was later restored.
High Fens	A wooden path across a landscape with high grasses	Liège	2008	v (cultural)	High Fens is an elevated plateau with forests and peat bogs. The cultural landscape has been shaped by centuries of human occupation, people used the area for wood, to collect peat, and for livestock grazing. The area is protected as a Ramsar wetland.
Roman causeway from Bavay to Tongeren		several sites	2008	iii, iv (cultural)	This nomination comprises the Belgian section of the Roman causeway that was connecting Cologne and Boulogne-sur-Mer. It was constructed to connect the two newly acquired provinces of the Roman Empire. Approximately every 30 km (19 mi), corresponding to a day's walk, there were road stops with workshops, temples, and baths. There are also monumental tombs from the late 1st century CE. In the 4th century, the road served as a defense line against the invasions of the Germanic tribes.
Prince-Bishops' Palace	A large two-storey public building with a clock tower and a large coat of arms above the entrance	Liège	2008	ii, iii (cultural)	The palace was the seat of the Prince-Bishopric of Liège, a Roman Catholic ecclesiastical principality of the Holy Roman Empire that was established under Charlemagne c. 800 CE. The first palace, constructed c. 1000, was destroyed by fire in 1185. The subsequent building was again destroyed by fire in 1505. Afterwards, a new palace was constructed under the cardinal Érard de la Marck. This palace included a Gothic Saint Lambert's Cathedral. During the Liège Revolution, in 1793, the cathedral was destroyed and the palace was badly damaged. In the mid-19th century, the palace was renovated in a neo-Gothic style. Today, the palace houses the provincial government as well as judicial institutions.
Battlefield of Waterloo, the End of the Napoleonic Period	A conical mound, covered in grass, with a lion statue on the top	Walloon Brabant	2008	ii, iii, vi (cultural)	At Waterloo, Napoleon did surrender, marking the end of the Napoleonic Wars, as well as the end of the revolutionary principles of equality and freedom. The battle between the French and the Allies took place on 18 June 1815. In the decades after the battle, numerous monuments were erected on site to commemorate the participating nations or personalities. The Lion's Mound, an artificial hill constructed in the 1820s, is pictured.
Panorama of the Battle of Waterloo	A circular building with an artificial hill in the background	Walloon Brabant	2008	i, ii, iv, vi (cultural)	The rotunda at the Battlefield of Waterloo was constructed in 1911 to house the panoramic painting by Louis Dumoulin. The painting, depicting various stages of the battle, is 110 m (360 ft) long and 12 m (39 ft) tall and is stitched from several individual canvases. The panorama genre was a very fashionable phenomenon in the 19th and early 20th centuries.
Meuse Citadels	A fortress on a hill above a river and a town	Liège, Namur	2008	ii (cultural)	This nomination comprises four citadels situated along the Meuse river. They were originally intended to defend the Prince-Bishopric of Liège and County of Namur and were later modernized during the periods of French and Dutch rule. These are the citadels of Namur, Huy, Dinant (pictured), and the remains of the Citadel of Liège which was largely demolished in the 1970s.
Hoge Kempen Rural - Industrial Transition Landscape	Two abandoned mine shafts in a forest setting	Limburg	2011	iv, vi, viii (mixed)	The landscape was shaped by the late Quaternary glaciation, with landforms such as dry valleys and gravel deposits. The cultural landscape was developed by a continuous human activity, with a sharp transition from a rural to industrial landscape after the discovery of coal in the early 20th century. This was followed by an influx of miners from different parts of Europe, resulted in a development of a unique culture. Today, several abandoned collieries are visible.
Neanderthal Fossil Sites in Wallonia	Entrance to a natural cave	Liège, Namur	2019	iii, iv (cultural)	Wallonia has a high concentration of site with Neanderthal remains, with eight sites discovered so far. Four archaeological sites are included in this nomination, the Schmerling Caves, the Sclayn Cave, the Goyet Caves, and the Spy Cave (pictured). The excavations has been taking place since the early 19th century and continue into the 21st century. The finds provide an insight into the life and culture of the Neanderthals, as well as their interaction with other human lineages.
Hospital Our Lady with the Rose	An inner courtyard of a two-storey building in red brick with Gothic arches	Hainaut	2019	iii, iv (cultural)	The hospital in Lessines was founded in 1242 to welcome the poor and pilgrims. Current buildings date from the 16th and 17th centuries, with some later additions. The hospital documents the development from a religious organization in the Middle Ages to a public health institution of the 19th and 20th centuries, as well as the evolution of medical practices, the conception of health, and hygiene. Today, the building serves as a museum.
Workers' Assembly Halls*	The façade of an Art Nouveau building	East Flanders	2025	iii, iv, vi (cultural)	These assembly halls were built as the result of the organization of workers worldwide and the spread of the labor movement and Socialism. This transnational nomination includes sites that reflect these global changes. From Belgium, Feestlokaal Vooruit in Ghent is nominated.

== See also ==
- Heritage registers in Belgium
- List of Intangible Cultural Heritage elements in Belgium
