= List of protected heritage sites in La Louvière =

This table shows an overview of the protected heritage sites in the Walloon town La Louvière. This list is part of Belgium's national heritage.

Object	Year/architect	Town/section	Address	Coordinates	Number^{?}	Image
Church of Saint-Vaast ^{(nl)} ^{(fr)}		La Louvière	Saint-Vaast	50.452412°N 4.159580°E	55022-CLT-0003-01 Info	Kerk Saint-Vaast
Chapel Notre-Dame-au-Puits ^{(nl)} ^{(fr)}		La Louvière		50.451302°N 4.146993°E	55022-CLT-0004-01 Info	Kapel Notre-Dame-au-Puits
Coal Mining and the oldest part of the town of Bois-du-Luc Houdeng Aimeries ^{(nl)} ^{(fr)}		La Louvière		50.474372°N 4.145879°E	55022-CLT-0005-01 Info	Steenkoolwinning en het oudste stadsdeel van Bois-du-Luc te Houdeng Aimeries
Ensemble of the farm Sart-Longchamps called "Ferme Guyaux" and surrounding areas ^{(nl)} ^{(fr)}		La Louvière	La Louvière	50.476210°N 4.203430°E	55022-CLT-0006-01 Info	
Expansion of the ensemble of the farm of Sart-Longchamps called "Ferme Guyaux" and surrounding areas ^{(nl)} ^{(fr)}		La Louvière	La Louvière	50.475375°N 4.200859°E	55022-CLT-0007-01 Info	
The barn of the farm of Sart-Longchamps ^{(nl)} ^{(fr)}		La Louvière	rue de Baume n°45, La Louvière	50.476628°N 4.200650°E	55022-CLT-0008-01 Info	
Facades and roofs of the house chaplain ^{(nl)} ^{(fr)}		La Louvière	rue des Ecoles n°16, La Louvière	50.459649°N 4.087724°E	55022-CLT-0010-01 Info	
Total chapel of Saint-Julien ^{(nl)} ^{(fr)}		La Louvière	La Louvière	50.459579°N 4.087754°E	55022-CLT-0011-01 Info	Totale kapel Saint-Julien
A dogwood and its surroundings ^{(nl)} ^{(fr)}		La Louvière	La Louvière	50.459097°N 4.115564°E	55022-CLT-0012-01 Info	Een kornoelje en zijn omgeving
Hydraulic lifts 1, 2, 3 and 4 located on the Canal du Centre and the bridge located between Nos. 3 and 4 (M) and the ensemble of these with the wooded shore banks ^{(nl)} ^{(fr)}		La Louvière		50.487427°N 4.175825°E	55022-CLT-0013-01 Info	Hydraulische liften nrs. 1, 2, 3 en 4 gelegen op het Canal du Centre en de ophaalbrug gelegen tussen nrs. 3 en 4 (M) en het ensemble van deze met de beboste oeverbanken
The facades and roofs of the building where the engine of lifts 2 and 3 are located ^{(nl)} ^{(fr)}		La Louvière		50.481386°N 4.136043°E	55022-CLT-0015-01 Info	De gevels en daken van het gebouw waarin de machinekamer van liften 2 en 3 zich bevindt
Terril n ° 142 called "Albert 1er" ^{(nl)} ^{(fr)}		La Louvière	rue Léopold III à Saint-Vaast	50.457161°N 4.154084°E	55022-CLT-0016-01 Info	Terril n°142 genaamd "Albert 1er"
Certain parts of the house ^{(nl)} ^{(fr)}		La Louvière	rue Warocqué 70-72, La Louvière	50.476502°N 4.193109°E	55022-CLT-0018-01 Info	Bepaalde delen van het huis
Certain parts of the "Royal Boch": three bottle ovens and building the workshop and the southern bottle ovens houses ^{(nl)} ^{(fr)}		La Louvière	rue Sylvain Guyaux 70, La Louvière	50.477876°N 4.182560°E	55022-CLT-0021-01 Info	
Facades and roofs of the presbytery ^{(nl)} ^{(fr)}		La Louvière	La Louvière	50.453778°N 4.200966°E	55022-CLT-0022-01 Info	Gevels en daken van de pastorie
Totality of the old Hôpital Saint-Julien ^{(nl)} ^{(fr)}		La Louvière	Boussoit	50.459332°N 4.087709°E	55022-CLT-0025-01 Info	Totaliteit van het oude hôpital Saint-Julien
Coal Mining and the oldest part of the town of Bois-du-Luc Houdeng Aimeries ^{(nl)} ^{(fr)}		La Louvière		50.474372°N 4.145879°E	55022-PEX-0001-01 Info	Steenkoolwinning en het oudste stadsdeel van Bois-du-Luc te Houdeng Aimeries
Hydraulic lifts 1, 2, 3 and 4 located on the Canal du Centre and the bridge located between Nos. 3 and 4 (M) and the ensemble of these with the wooded shore banks ^{(nl)} ^{(fr)}		La Louvière		50.487427°N 4.175825°E	55022-PEX-0002-01 Info	Hydraulische liften nrs. 1, 2, 3 en 4 gelegen op het Canal du Centre en de ophaalbrug gelegen tussen nrs. 3 en 4 (M) en het ensemble van deze met de beboste oeverbanken

== See also ==
- List of protected heritage sites in Hainaut (province)
- La Louvière
