= Stratigraphic section =

Sequence of layers of rocks in the order they were deposited

A stratigraphic section of the Blegny coal mine in Belgium.

A stratigraphic section is a sequence of layers of rocks in the order they were deposited. It is based on the principle of original horizontality, which states that layers of sediment are originally deposited horizontally under the action of gravity.

Biostratigraphers estimate the age of stratigraphic sections by using the faunal assemblages contained within rock samples from outcrop and drill cores. Geochronologists precisely date rocks within the stratigraphic section to provide better absolute bounds on the timing and rates of deposition. Magnetic stratigraphers look for signs of magnetic reversals in igneous rock units within the drill cores. Other scientists perform stable-isotope studies on the rocks to gain information about past climate. Stratigraphic sections can also be used to locate areas for water, coal, and hydrocarbon extraction, particularly petroleum and natural gas.

A Global Boundary Stratotype Section and Point (GSSP) is an internationally agreed upon reference point on a stratigraphic section which defines the lower boundaries of stages on the geologic time scale. (Recently this has been used to define the base of a system)

== Gallery ==
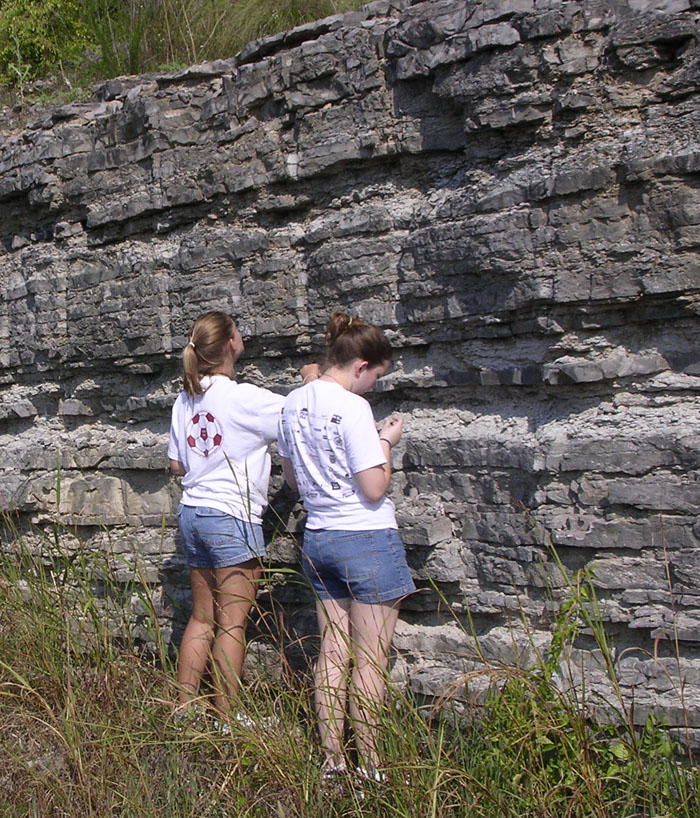
A stratigraphic section of Ordovician limestone exposed in central Tennessee.

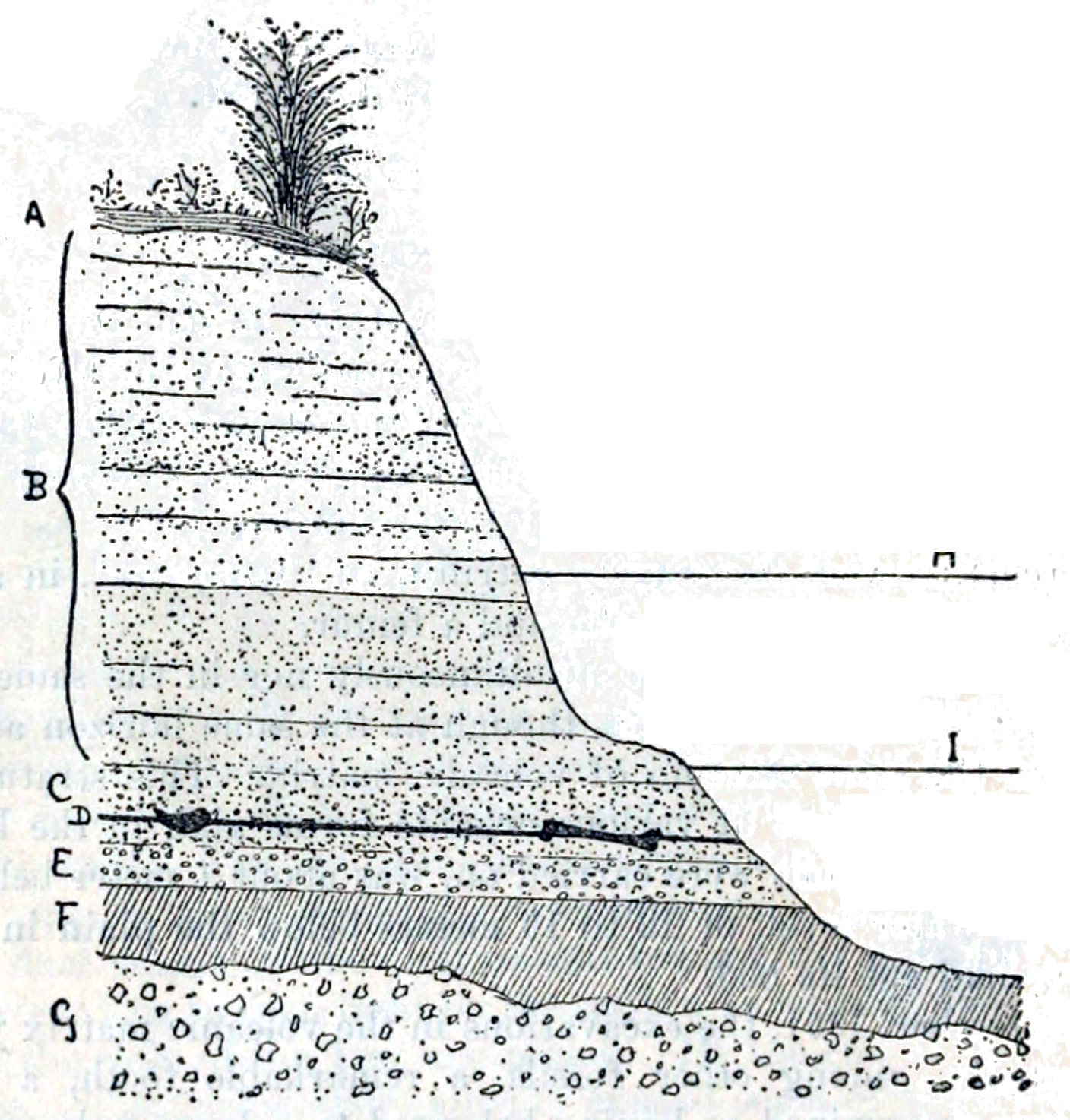
A stratigraphic section of the site where Java Man was found.

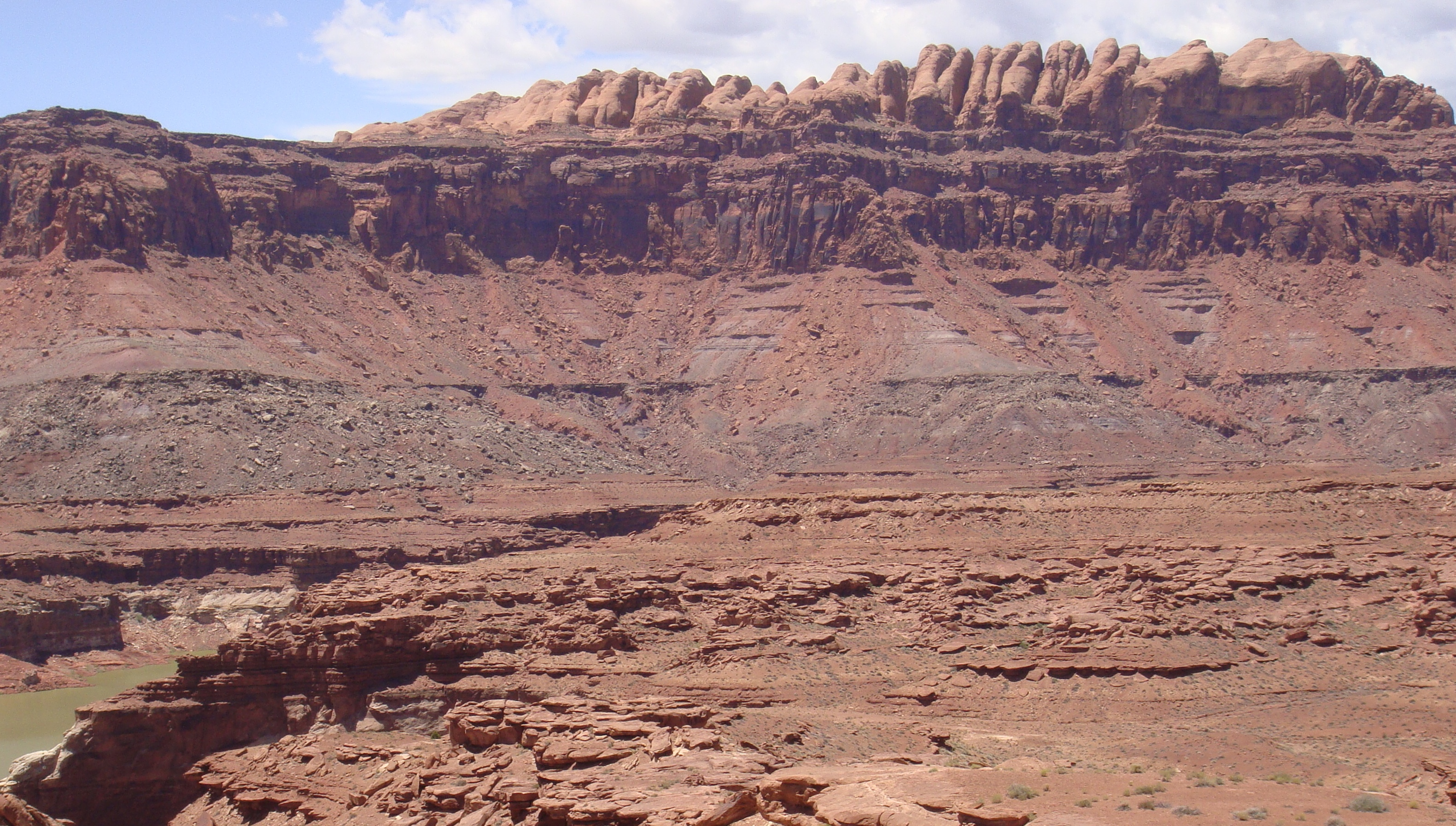
The Permian through Jurassic stratigraphy of the Colorado Plateau area of southeastern Utah.

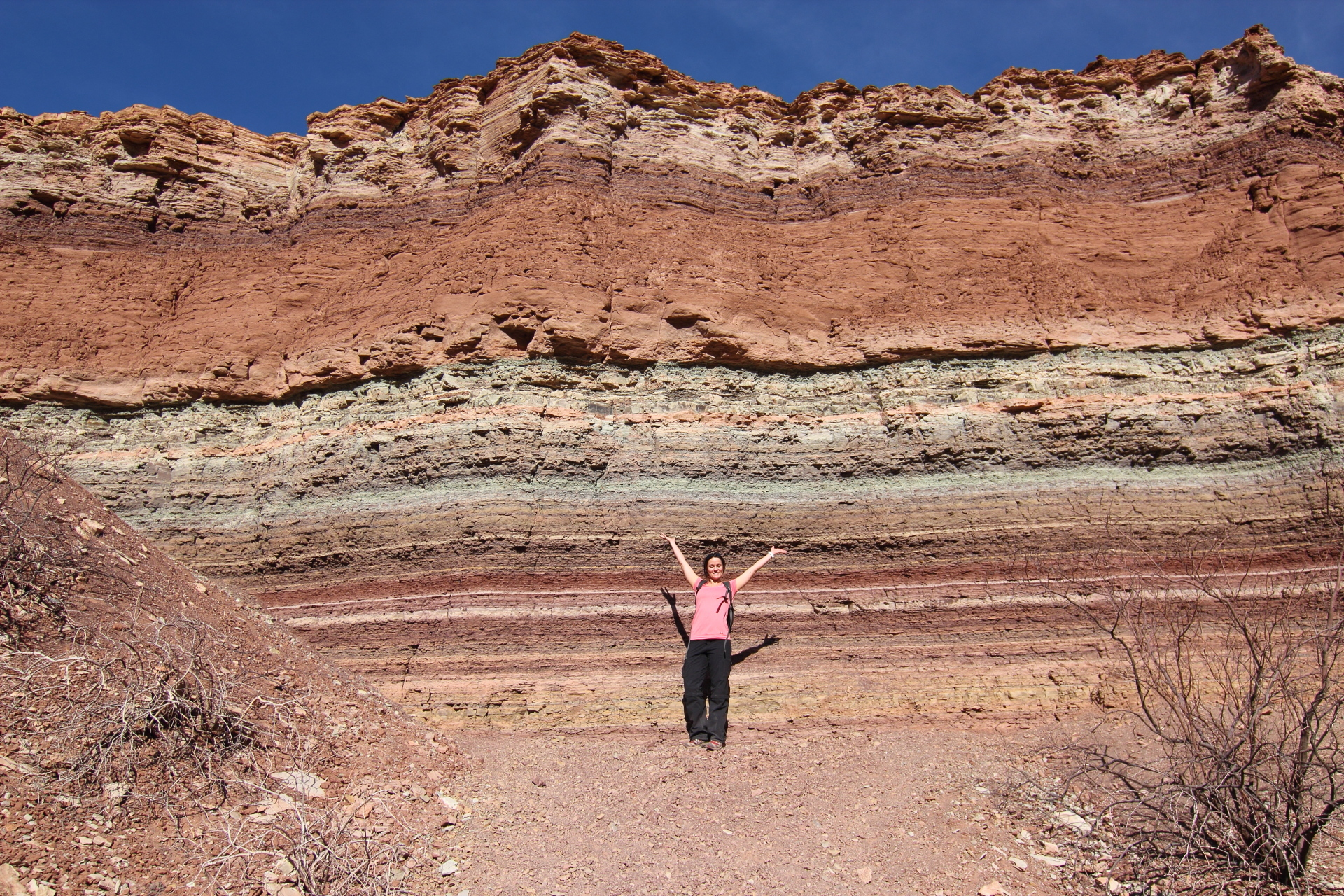
Strata in Salta, Argentina.

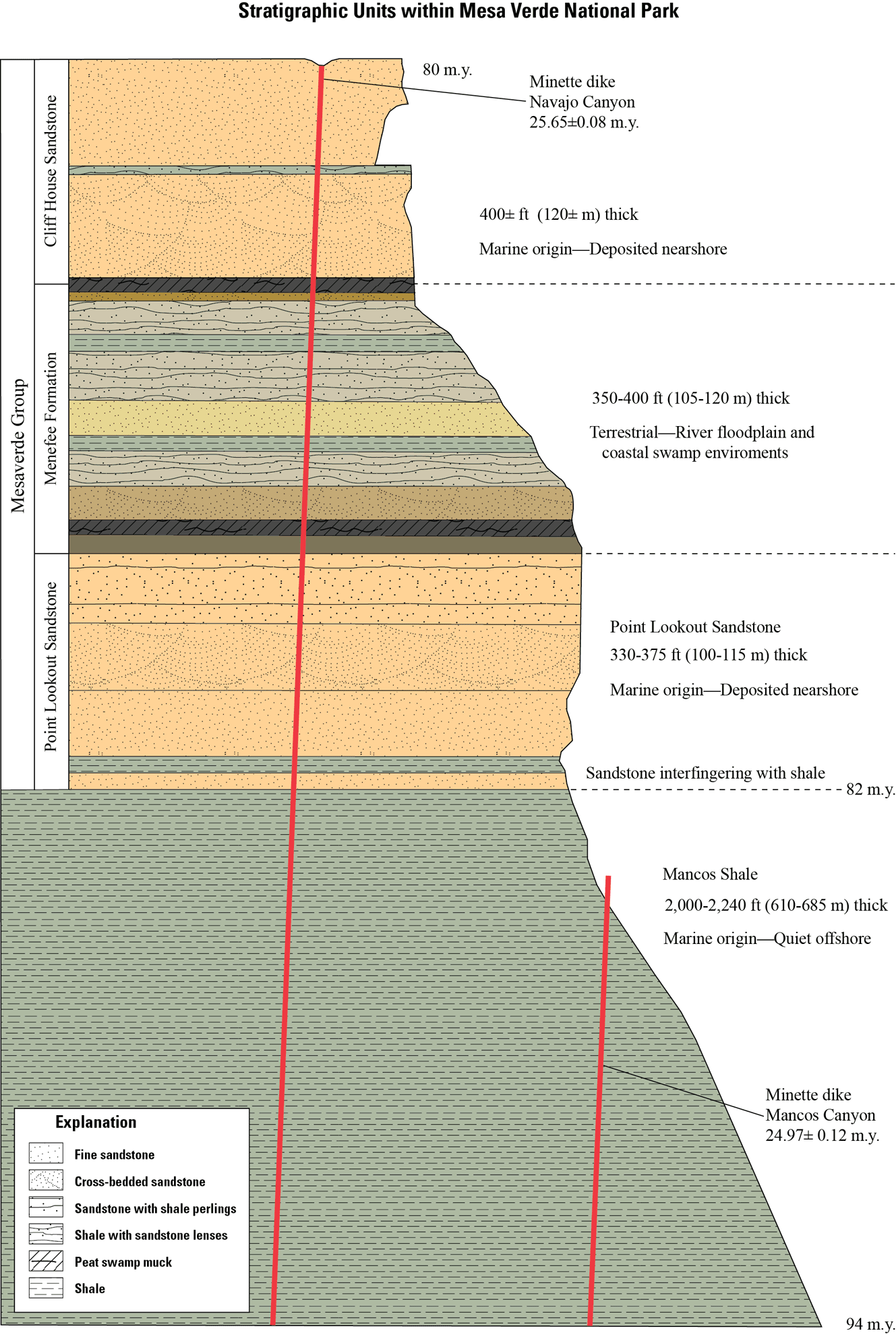
Stratigraphic section of formations exposed at the surface, Mesa Verde National Park, Colorado (USGS).

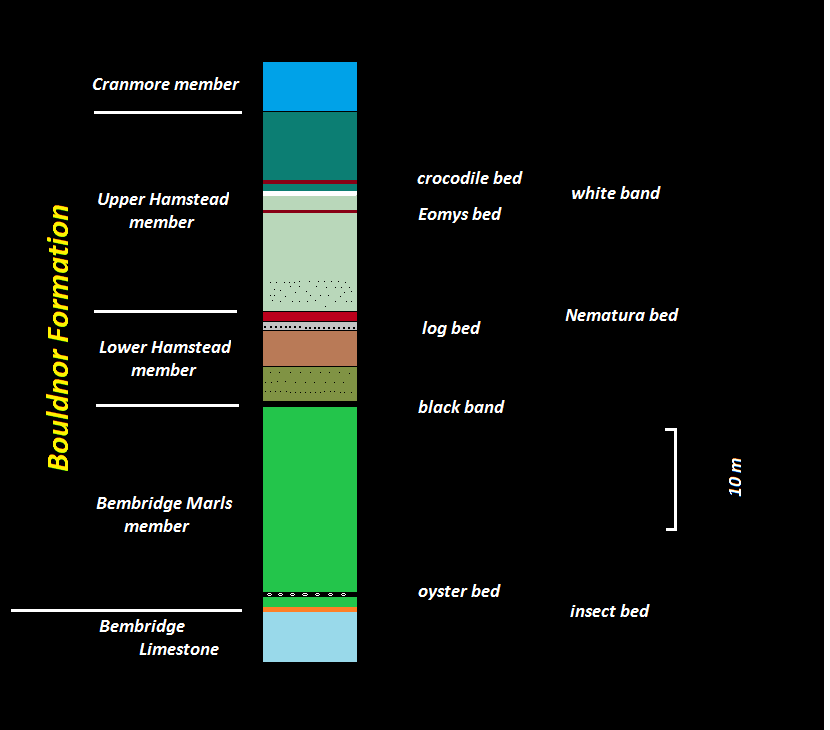
Stratigraphic section of the Bouldnor Formation

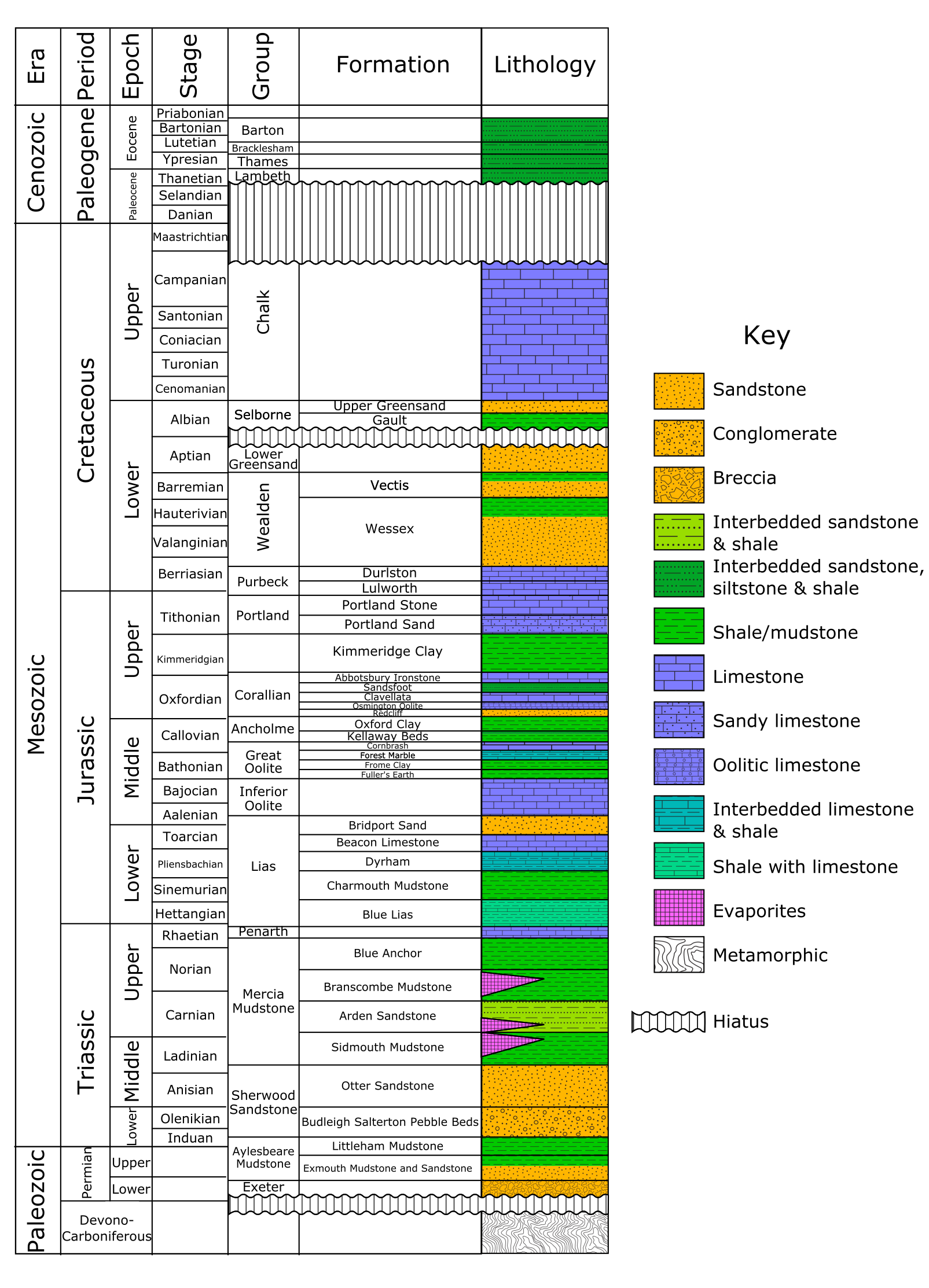
Lithostratigraphy of the Wessex Basin.

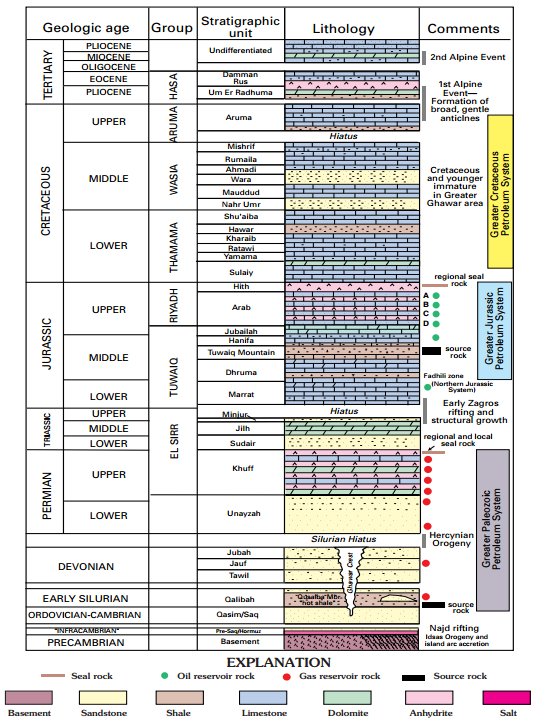
Stratigraphic section, major tectonic events, and stratigraphic units that make up the Greater Paleozoic, Jurassic, and Cretaceous petroleum systems of the eastern Arabian Peninsula.
