= Houdeng-Aimeries =

Section of La Louvière, Belgium

Houdeng-Aimeries Oudè
- Village
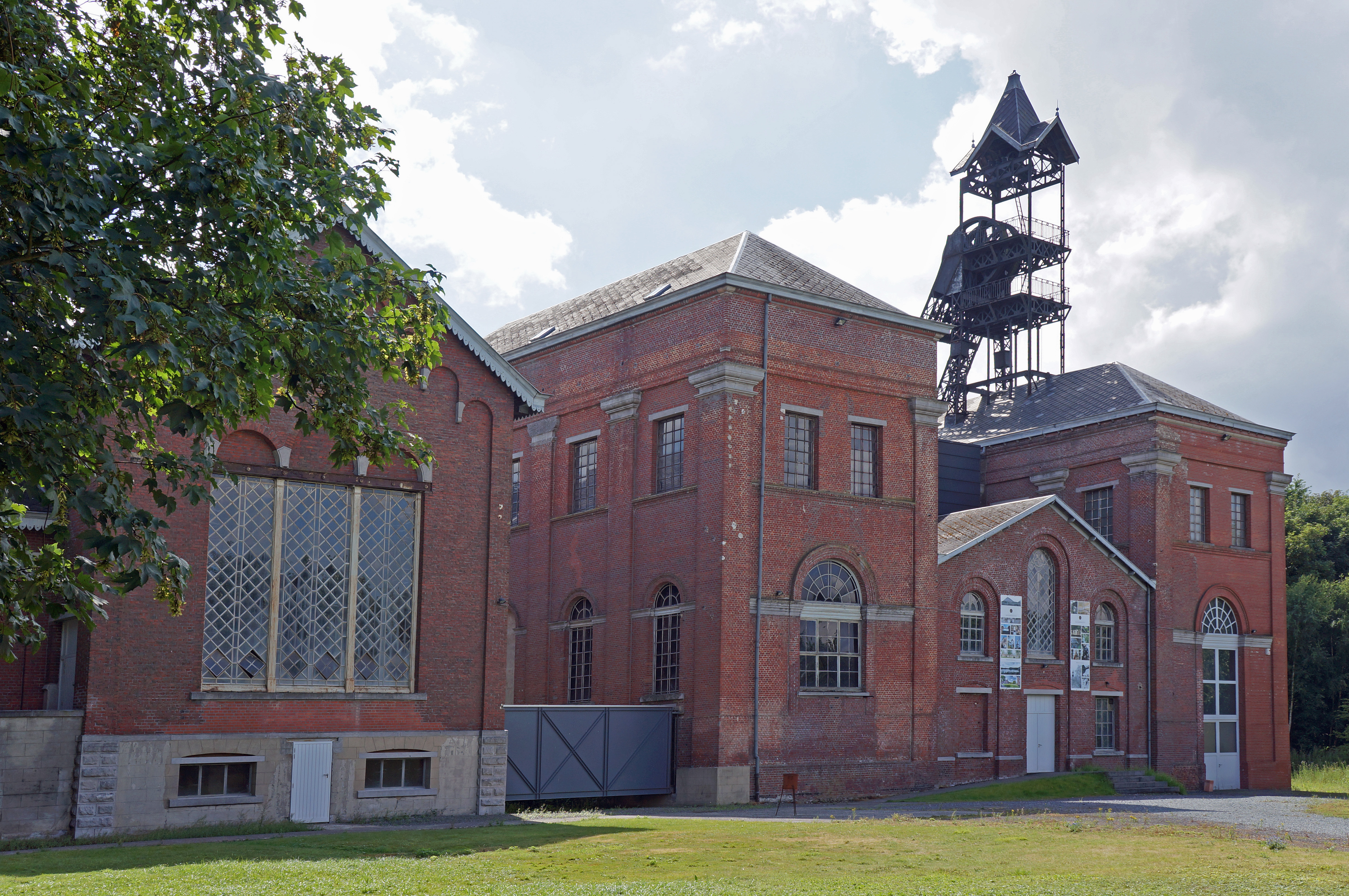
- Modern view of the Bois-du-Luc
- Interactive map of Houdeng-Aimeries
- Coordinates: 50°29′N 4°9′E
- Country: Belgium
- Region: Wallonia
- Province: Hainaut
- Municipality: La Louvière

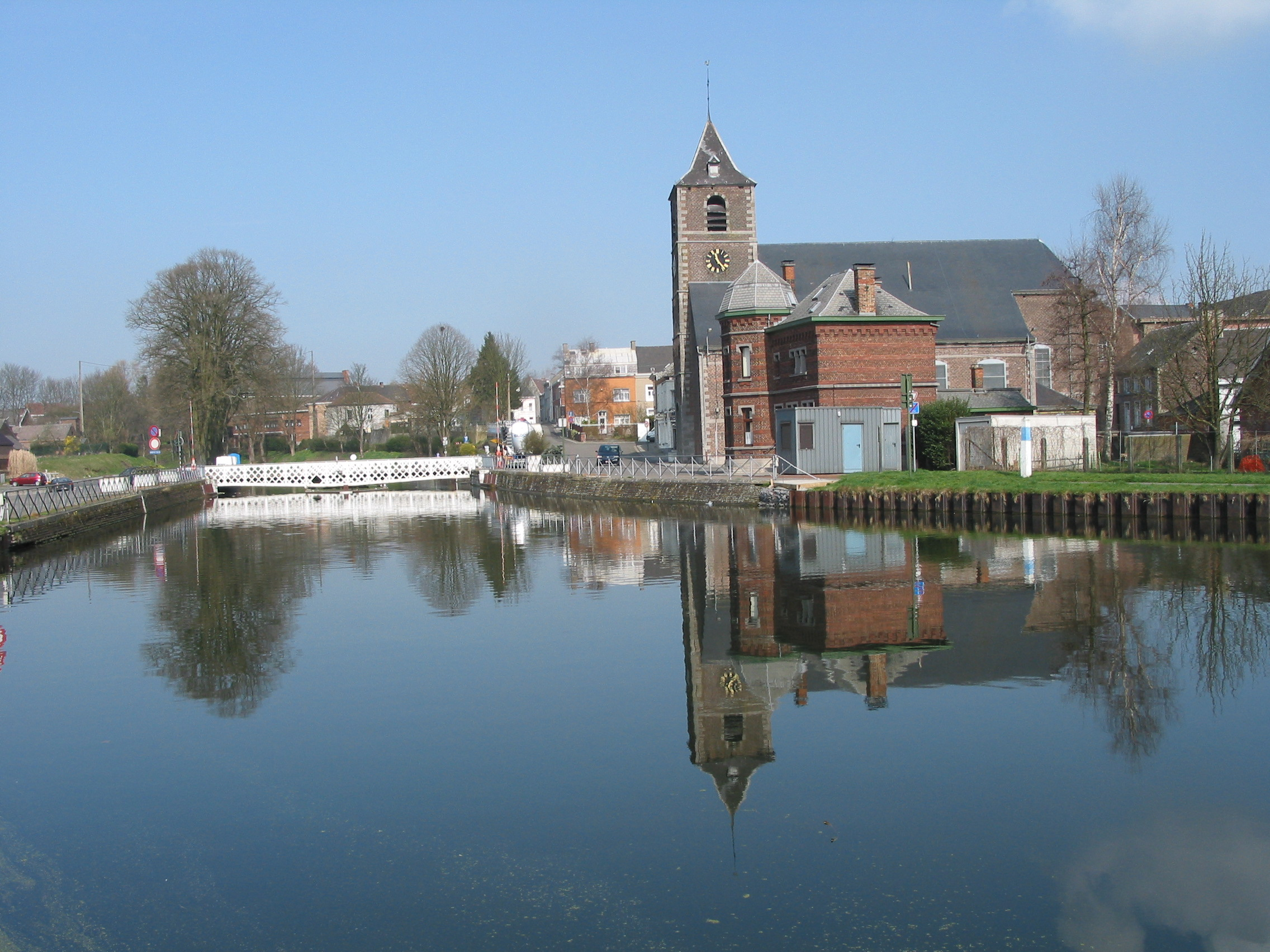
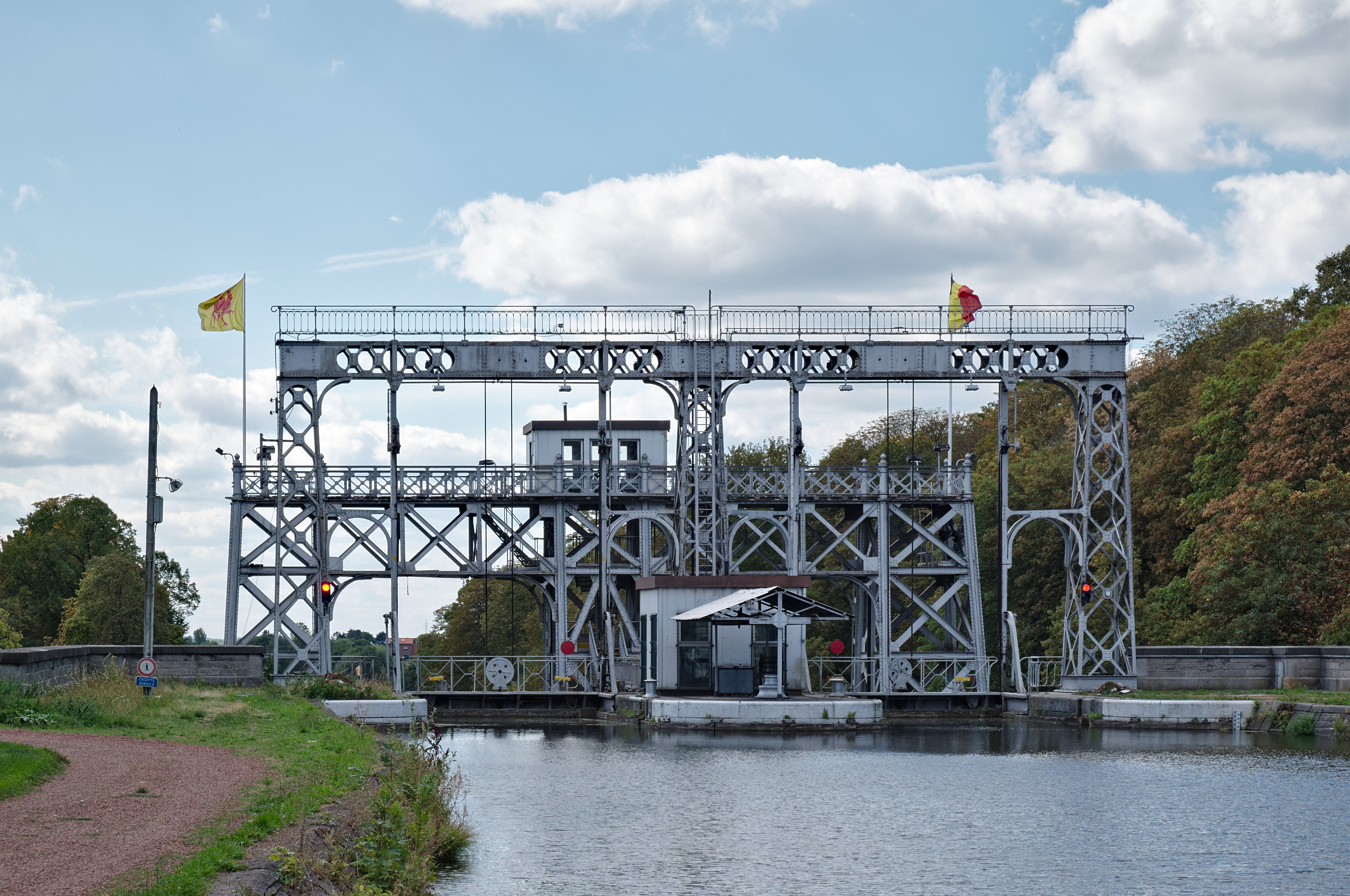
The old Canal du Centre at Houdeng-Aimeries (left) and its boat lift (right)

Houdeng-Aimeries (Walloon: Oudè) is a village of Wallonia and a district of the municipality of La Louvière, located in the province of Hainaut, Belgium.

The village contains two UNESCO World Heritage sites; its 16.93 m high boat lift was listed in 1998, together with the other three hydraulic boat lifts on the Canal du Centre near La Louvière, and Bois-du-Luc is a former coal mine today preserved as one of the four Walloon mining sites listed in 2012 under the Major Mining Sites of Wallonia.
