= La Louvière =

City in Hainaut Province, Wallonia, Belgium

La Louvière: El Lovire (Walloon)
- Municipality
- Aerial view of La Louvière.

- Flag Coat of arms

- Location of La Louvière in Hainaut
- Interactive map of La Louvière
- Location in Belgium
- Coordinates: 50°28′N 04°11′E
- Country: Belgium
- Community: French Community
- Region: Wallonia
- Province: Hainaut
- Arrondissement: La Louvière

Government
  - Mayor: Jacques Gobert (PS)
  - Governing parties: PS, MR, UDSC

Area
  - Total: 64.56 km^{2} (24.93 sq mi)

Population (2019-09-01)
  - Total: 80,986
  - Density: 1,254/km^{2} (3,249/sq mi)
- Postal codes: 7100, 7110
- NIS code: 58001
- Area codes: 064
- Website: www.lalouviere.be

La Louvière (French pronunciation: [la luvjɛʁ]; Walloon: El Lovire) is a municipality and city of Wallonia located in the province of Hainaut, Belgium.

The municipality consists of the following districts: Boussoit, Haine-Saint-Paul, Haine-Saint-Pierre, Houdeng-Aimeries, Houdeng-Gœgnies, La Louvière, Maurage, Saint-Vaast, Strépy-Bracquegnies, and Trivières.

La Louvière is the capital of the Centre region, a former coal mining area in the Sillon industriel, between the Borinage to the West and the Pays Noir to the East.

== History ==
=== Mythical origins ===
The legend of a mother wolf nursing a child at La Louvière is reminiscent of the mythical birth of Rome. The true origin of the city, however, dates from the 12th century. At that time, the forested, and presumably wolf-infested, territory of today's La Louvière was named Menaulu, from the Old French meaning "wolf's lair". This land was part of the larger community of Saint-Vaast, which itself belonged to the Aulne Abbey.

By 1284, the name of the territory had been translated into Latin, then back into French to its current name of La Louvière. The lords of Saint-Vaast encouraged prospecting on their land, which led to the first extraction of coal in the year 1390. The abbey's refusal to provide necessary infrastructure, however, delayed large-scale development until the 18th century.

=== Birth of La Louvière ===
In the 19th century, the construction of roads, canals, and railways finally allowed the local coal production to be exported. Investments also poured into the local industry to take advantage of the abundant source of energy. La Louvière quickly surpassed its overlord Saint-Vaast, both in population and economic wealth. Within fifty years, the territory that was not much more than a place name had become one of the most important cities in Wallonia. La Louvière was recognized as an independent city in 1869. Today, La Louvière is still the fifth largest city in Wallonia, after Charleroi, Liège, Namur, and Mons.

== Sights ==
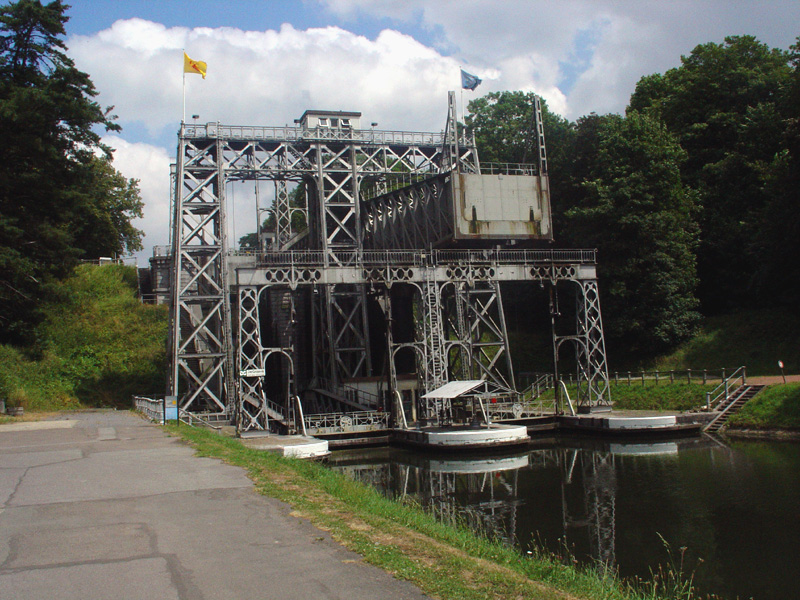
Boat lift on the old Canal du Centre

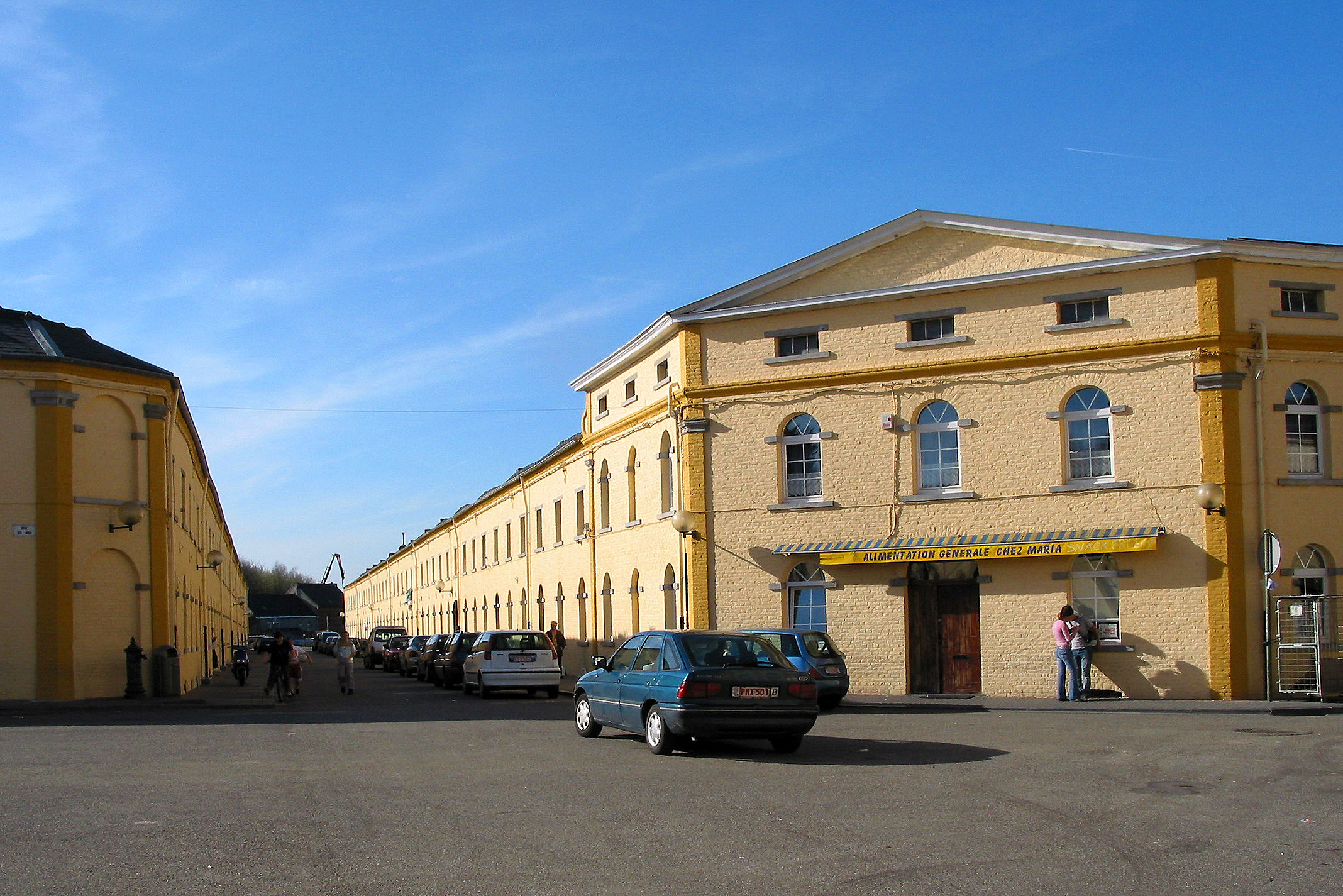
Workers' housing at Bois-du-Luc (1838-1853)

- There are four hydraulic boat lifts on the old Canal du Centre, which connects the river Meuse to the Scheldt. These double elevators date from around 1900 and were designated by UNESCO as a World Heritage Site in 1998.
- The housing complex that was built for the Bois-du-Luc coal workers during the first half of the 19th century has been restored. This is part of the Major Mining Sites of Wallonia, designated by UNESCO as a World Heritage Site in 2012. One of those houses can be visited, together with a couple of museums retracing the history of the coal mining industry in the Centre region.
- La Louvière counts a number of chapels and churches that date from the 13th to the 16th century.
- La Louvière also has one of the best collection of Idel Ianchelevici’s works on display.

== Climate ==
La Louvière has an oceanic climate typical of Belgium with moderated seasons even for its inland position at 50° latitude, as a result of Gulf Stream influence.

Climate data for La Louvière (1981–2010 normals, sunshine 1984–2013)
Month	Jan	Feb	Mar	Apr	May	Jun	Jul	Aug	Sep	Oct	Nov	Dec	Year
Mean daily maximum °C (°F)	5.5 (41.9)	6.5 (43.7)	10.2 (50.4)	14.0 (57.2)	18.1 (64.6)	20.7 (69.3)	23.2 (73.8)	22.9 (73.2)	19.2 (66.6)	14.8 (58.6)	9.5 (49.1)	6.0 (42.8)	14.2 (57.6)
Daily mean °C (°F)	2.9 (37.2)	3.3 (37.9)	6.3 (43.3)	9.1 (48.4)	13.1 (55.6)	15.8 (60.4)	18.1 (64.6)	17.7 (63.9)	14.6 (58.3)	10.9 (51.6)	6.5 (43.7)	3.5 (38.3)	10.1 (50.2)
Mean daily minimum °C (°F)	0.3 (32.5)	0.1 (32.2)	2.5 (36.5)	4.3 (39.7)	8.2 (46.8)	11.0 (51.8)	13.0 (55.4)	12.6 (54.7)	10.0 (50.0)	7.1 (44.8)	3.5 (38.3)	1.2 (34.2)	6.2 (43.2)
Average precipitation mm (inches)	76.8 (3.02)	63.5 (2.50)	74.6 (2.94)	53.5 (2.11)	72.7 (2.86)	78.6 (3.09)	76.3 (3.00)	80.0 (3.15)	65.0 (2.56)	76.7 (3.02)	77.4 (3.05)	80.9 (3.19)	876.0 (34.49)
Average precipitation days	13.2	11.4	13.4	10.4	11.9	11.4	10.5	10.7	10.9	11.4	13.4	13.4	142.1
Mean monthly sunshine hours	53	73	118	169	200	194	212	202	145	115	64	44	1,588
Source: Royal Meteorological Institute

== Demographics ==
Group of origin	Year		Year		Year		Year	
Group of origin	2000		2010		2020		2026	
Group of origin	Number	%	Number	%	Number	%	Number	%
Belgians with Belgian background	43,544	56,9	40,100	51,4	37,441	46,1	35,687	43,6
Belgians with foreign background	16,438	21,5	24,228	31	29,672	36,6	32,383	39,6
Neighbouring country	1,952	2,55	2,352	3,01	2,498	3,07	2,524	3,08
EU27 (excluding neighbouring country)	12,285	16,04	16,502	21,13	18,379	22,65	18,231	22,30
Outside EU 27	2,228	2,91	5,374	6,88	8,795	10,84	11,628	14,22
Non-Belgians	16,586	21,6	13,743	17,6	14,025	17,3	13,681	16,8
Neighbouring country	893	1,16	886	1,13	951	1,17	920	1,12
EU27 (excluding neighbouring country)	14,060	18,36	10,971	14,05	10,073	12,41	9,417	11,51
Outside EU 27	1,633	2,13	1,886	2,41	3,001	3,70	3,344	4,09
Total Population	76,568	100	78,071	100	81,138	100	81,751	100

== Folklore ==
The Carnival of La Louvière is called Laetare, after the Latin verb meaning “to enjoy” (the introit at mass on the fourth Sunday of Lent begins Laetare Jerusalem, Rejoice Jerusalem). It lasts three days, Sunday to Tuesday, and takes place in the middle of Lent. The Gilles are out on all three days, stomping to the rhythm of their music and distributing oranges to the passers-by. Giant puppets and various other groups also take part in the parades and festivities. Typical of La Louvière’s celebrations is the so-called Brûlage des Bosses (“burning of the humps”), where a puppet dressed as a Gilles is burnt to symbolize the end of carnival and beginning of a new life.

== Sports ==
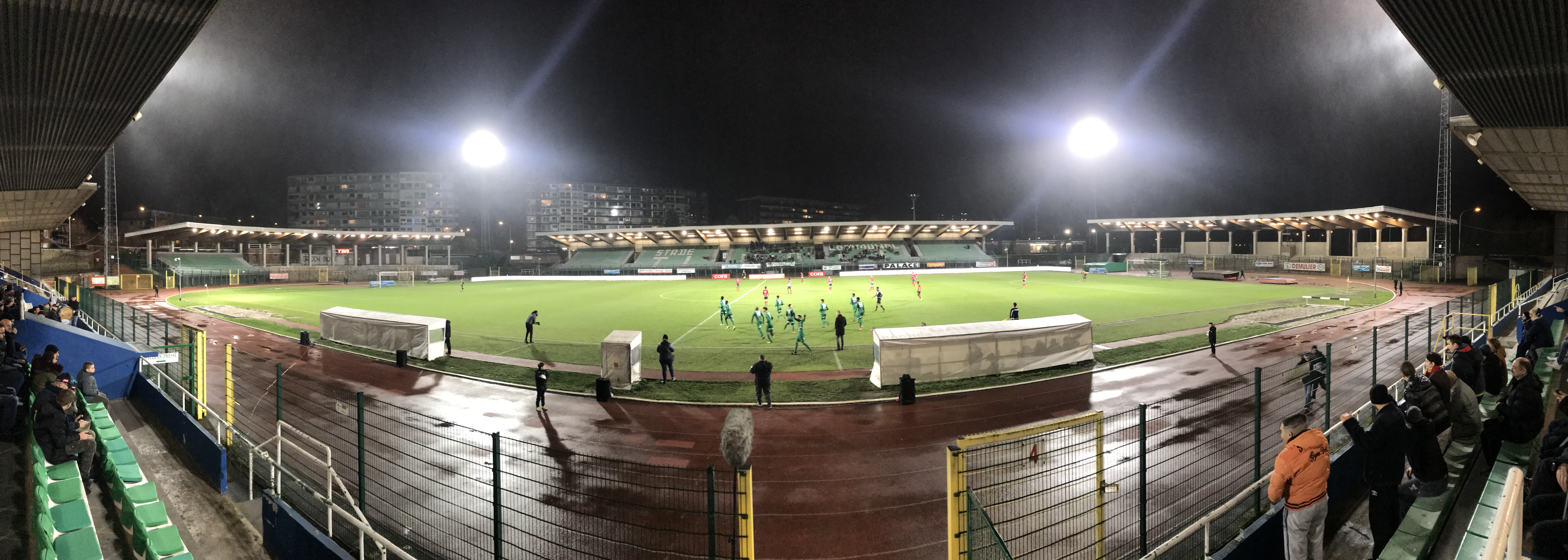
Stade du Tivoli

La Louvière used to have a top level football club in Belgian First Division: RAA Louviéroise. They won the Belgian Cup in 2003. the club no longer exists as it merged into a team based in another city and its La Louvière playground is now the home of third division semi-amateur club UR La Louvière Centre.

== Famous inhabitants ==
- Maurice Baudoux, (1902–1988), Canadian priest and Archbishop
- Anna Boch, (1848–1936), impressionist painter and art collector
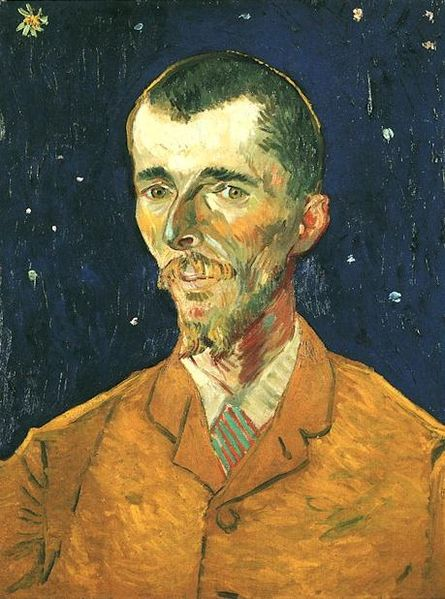
  Van Gogh - Portrait of Eugène Boch 1888
- Eugène Boch, (1855–1941), impressionist painter, art collector, and friend of Vincent van Gogh
- Pol Bury, sculptor (1922–2005)
- Jey Crisfar, actor (born 1988)
- Clement Desalle, Motocross racer (born 1989)
- Franco Dragone, theatre director (born 1952)
- Yves Jean Fontaine, (born 1954) Major General (ret.), United States Army
- Maurice Grevisse, grammarian (1895–1980)
- Eden Hazard, footballer (born 1991)
- Thorgan Hazard, footballer (born 1993)
- Kylian Hazard, footballer (born 1995)
- Jean Louvet, playwright (1934–2015)
- Enzo Scifo, footballer (born 1966)
- Charline Vanhoenacker, journalist (born 1977)
- Jordan "Abuzah" François, 2026 CDL World Champion (born 2000)

== Twin cities ==
- France: Saint-Maur-des-Fossés
- Italy: Foligno
- Spain: Córdoba
- Slovakia: Bojnice
- Poland: Kalisz
- Turkey: Giresun
