= List of Intangible Cultural Heritage elements in Belgium =

The United Nations Educational, Scientific and Cultural Organisation (UNESCO) intangible cultural heritage elements are the non-physical traditions and practices performed by a people. As part of a country's cultural heritage, they include celebrations, festivals, performances, oral traditions, music, and the making of handicrafts. The "intangible cultural heritage" is defined by the Convention for the Safeguarding of Intangible Cultural Heritage, drafted in 2003 and took effect in 2006. Inscription of new heritage elements on the UNESCO Intangible Cultural Heritage Lists is determined by the Intergovernmental Committee for the Safeguarding of Intangible Cultural Heritage, an organisation established by the convention.

Belgium ratified the convention on 24 March 2006.

== Intangible Cultural Heritage of Humanity ==
+ Transnational element

=== Representative List ===
Name	Image	Year	No.	Description
Carnival of Binche		2008	00033	The Carnival of Binche is an annual festival held in Binche during the Sunday, Monday, and Tuesday preceding Ash Wednesday.
Processional giants and dragons in Belgium and France + (Note: Shared with France.)		2008	00153	The processional giants and dragons of Belgium and France are a set of folkloric manifestations involving processional giants and dragons.
Procession of the Holy Blood in Bruges		2009	00263	The Procession of the Holy Blood is a religious Catholic procession which takes place each Ascension Day in Bruges.
Krakelingen and Tonnekensbrand, end-of-winter bread and fire feast at Geraardsbergen		2010	00401	Krakelingen and Tonnekensbrand are the names of annual centuries-old festivities in Geraardsbergen.
Houtem Jaarmarkt, annual winter fair and livestock market at Sint-Lievens-Houtem		2010	00403	Each November, Sint-Lievens-Houtem holds a winter fair and livestock market, the Houtem Jaarmarkt, where hundreds of traders sell cattle and horses.
Leuven age set ritual repertoire		2011	00404	The Leuven age set ritual is a tradition of men from Leuven born the same year.
Marches of Entre-Sambre-et-Meuse		2012	00670	The Marches of Entre-Sambre-et-Meuse are a set of folk marches, taking place from May to October in Entre-Sambre-et-Meuse.
Shrimp fishing on horseback in Oostduinkerke		2013	00673	Shrimp fishing on horseback in Oostduinkerke.
Beer culture in Belgium		2016	01062	Beer in Belgium includes pale ales, lambics, Flemish red ales, sour brown ales, strong ales and stouts.
Ommegang of Brussels, an annual historical procession and popular festival		2019	01366	The Ommegang of Brussels is a traditional Ommegang, a type of medieval pageant, celebrated annually in Brussels.
Musical art of horn players, an instrumental technique linked to singing, breath control, vibrato, resonance of place and conviviality + (Note: Shared with France, Luxembourg, and Italy.)		2020	01581	
Namur stilt jousting		2021	01590	Stilt jousting is a 600-year-old tradition of Namur, in which costumed people on stilts joust.
Falconry, a living human heritage + (Note: Shared with Austria, Croatia, Czechia, France, Germany, Hungary, Ireland, Italy, Kazakhstan, Kyrgyzstan, Mongolia, Morocco, Netherlands, Pakistan, Poland, Portugal, Qatar, Saudi Arabia, Slovakia, South Korea, Spain, Syria, and the United Arab Emirates.)		2021	01708	The origin of falconry goes back to the use of hunting by birds of prey as a mean of hunting but it has evolved over time to become part of the cultural heritage of the people.
Traditional irrigation: knowledge, technique, and organization + (Note: Shared with Austria, Germany, Italy, Luxembourg, Netherlands, and Switzerland.)		2023	01979	
Funfair culture + (Note: Shared with France.)		2024	02108	
Art of dry stone construction, knowledge and techniques + (Note: Shared with Croatia, Cyprus, France, Greece, Italy, Slovenia, Spain, Switzerland, Andorra, Austria, Ireland, and Luxembourg.)		2024	02106	Dry stone is a building method by which structures are constructed from stones without any mortar to bind them together.
Brussels' rod marionette tradition		2025	02313	

=== Good Safeguarding Practices ===
Name	Year	No.	Description
Programme of cultivating ludodiversity: safeguarding traditional games in Flanders	2011	00513	
Safeguarding the carillon culture: preservation, transmission, exchange and awareness-raising	2014	01017	
Tocatì, a shared programme for the safeguarding of traditional games and sports + (Note: Shared with Croatia, Cyprus, France, and Italy.)	2022	01709	
Safeguarding foster care heritage in the merciful city of Geel: a community-based care model	2023	00622	

== See also ==
- List of World Heritage Sites in Belgium
