= Boussoit =

Coordinates: 50.459932°N 4.083432°E

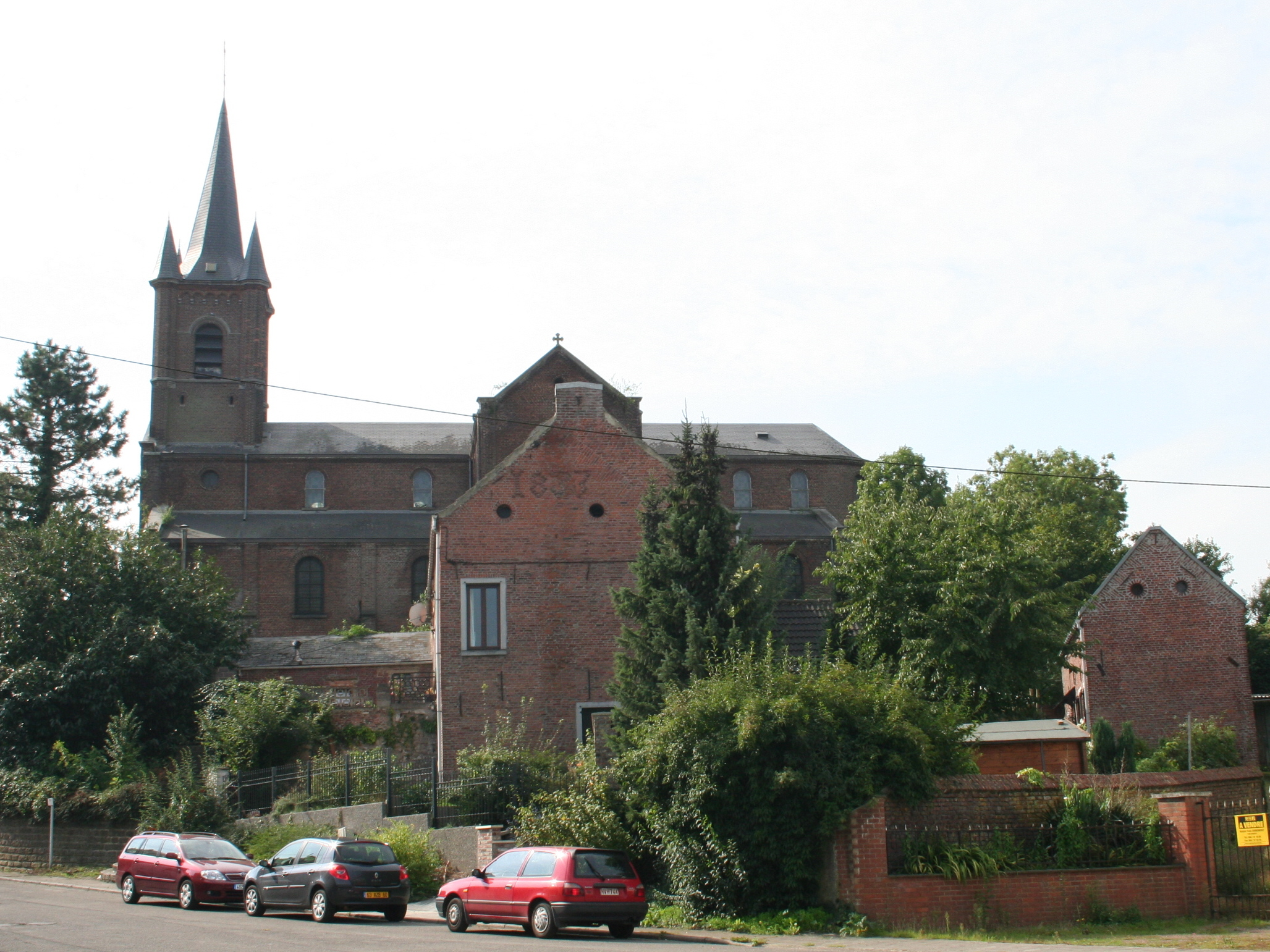
Boussoit, the Church.

Boussoit (Walloon: Bouswa) is a village of Wallonia and a district of the municipality of La Louvière, located in the province of Hainaut, Belgium. It was a separate municipality before the merger of municipalities in 1977.

This rural locality is fortunate to have a very fine and rare example of a small medieval Hôtel-Dieu.
