= Marcinelle mining disaster =

1956 mining disaster in Marcinelle, Belgium

Coordinates: 50°22′52″N 04°26′36″E

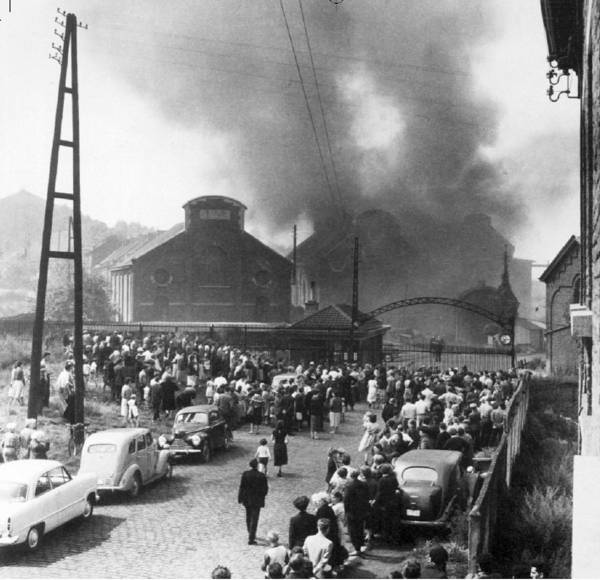
- The area next to the mining after the disaster
- Date: 8 August 1956
- Location: Marcinelle, Belgium
- Type: Mining accident
- Deaths: 262

The Marcinelle mining disaster (French: Catastrophe de Marcinelle, lit. 'the Marcinelle catastrophe') occurred at the Bois du Cazier coal mine at Marcinelle, Hainaut Province, in Belgium on 8 August 1956. One of the largest and most notorious mining disasters in the country's history, it led to the deaths of 262 miners, many of whom were guest workers from Italy.

On the morning of 8 August 1956, an accident occurred underground as a result of the attempt to use the hoist mechanism before a coal wagon had been correctly loaded into the lift. Cables were severed, and an electrical fire broke out at a time when there were 274 workers underground. As a result of measures introduced to respond to the labour shortage in post-war Belgium, the majority of the workers were guest workers from Italy and other parts of Europe.

Although attempts were made to rescue the workers, 262 miners died of smoke inhalation and carbon monoxide poisoning. Widely covered at the time in newspapers and television reports, the disaster remains prominent in folk memory in Belgium and Italy. The Bois du Cazier mine now operates as a museum.

== Background ==
Coal mining was historically a major industry in Belgium and a major force during the era of the Industrial Revolution. It was concentrated around three mining basins in Hainaut, Liège and latterly Limburg province. The Bois du Cazier mine was located in the former at Marcinelle in the region around Charleroi known as the Pays Noir.

Although increasingly struggling to compete with foreign competition, the Belgian economic miracle at the end of World War II gave renewed life to the coal industry which increasingly struggled to recruit miners within Belgium. The use of German prisoners of war became increasingly difficult and, in response, the Belgian government created various guest worker programs aimed at encouraging workers to travel to Belgium on work contracts. The first such agreement was made with Italy in 1946.

== Marcinelle disaster ==
On 8 August 1956, a major mining disaster occurred at the Bois du Cazier mine. The accident initiated at 8:10 am when the hoist mechanism in one of the shafts was started before the coal wagon had been completely loaded into the cage. Electric cables ruptured, starting an underground fire within the shaft. The moving cage also ruptured oil and air pipes which made the fire worse and destroyed much of the winch mechanism. Smoke and carbon monoxide spread down the mine, killing all the miners trapped by the fire. At the time of the incident, 274 people were working in Bois du Cazier, also known as Puits Saint-Charles.

Rescue operations continued until August 23 when the final verdict came from the mouth of a rescuer: "Tutti cadaveri!" (All corpses). Of the 274 people working on that morning, only twelve survived. Most of the victims were immigrants. Among the victims, there were 136 Italians, 95 Belgians, eight Poles, six Greeks, five Germans, five Frenchmen, three Hungarians, one Englishman, one Dutchman, one Russian and one Ukrainian. The incident prompted Italy to demand better working conditions for the Italian guest workers in Belgium. Belgium, however, decided to recruit foreign workers from other countries more actively.

== Trial ==
In the resulting prosecution, the trial court acquitted all of the accused on 1 October 1959. An appeal was lodged, and on 30 January 1961, the court gave the mine manager a six-month suspended jail sentence and a 2,000 Belgian franc fine (equivalent to €300 in 2006 after adjusting for inflation) and acquitted the other defendants.

== Aftermath ==
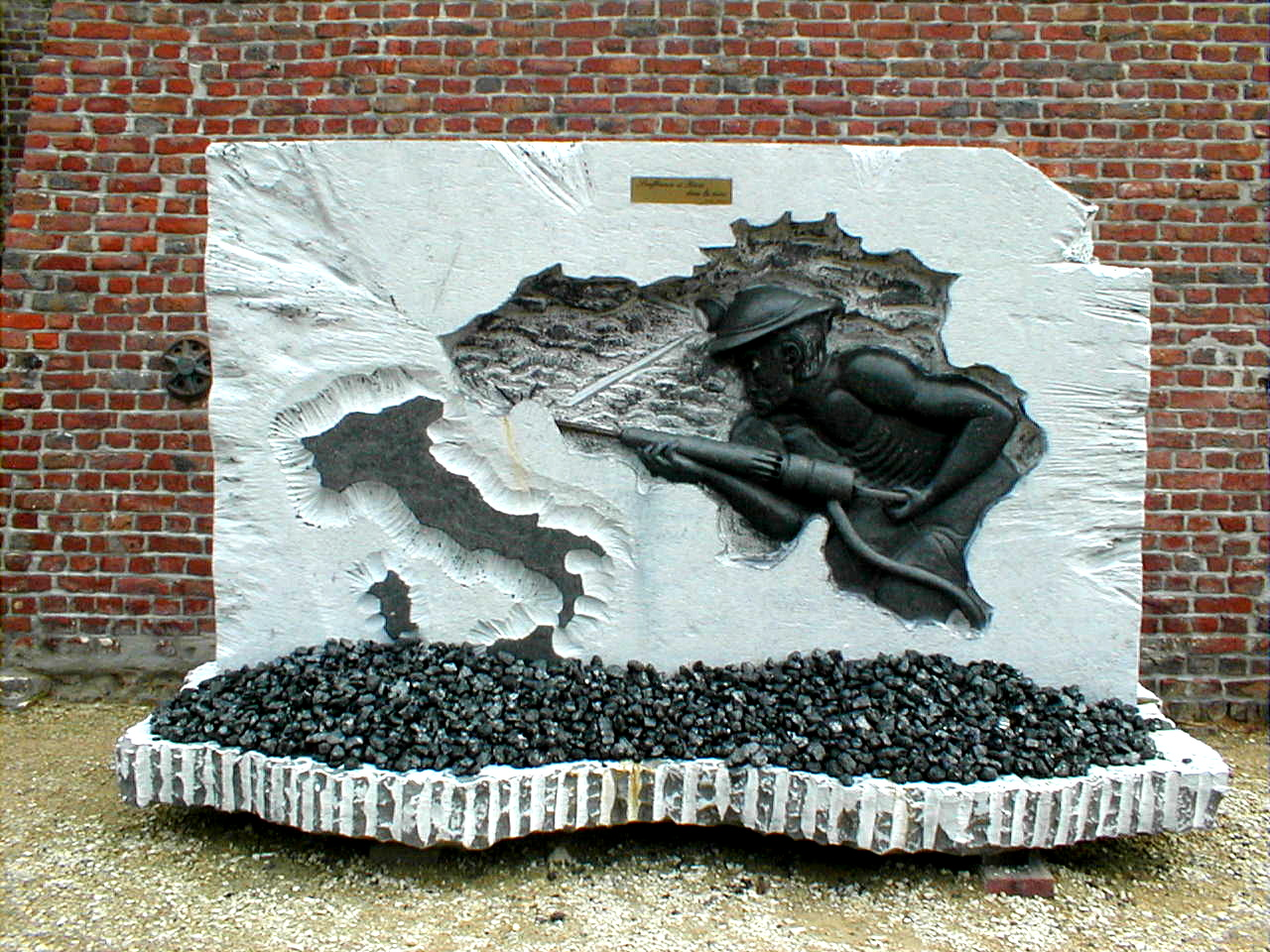
Memorial at the Bois du Cazier mine commemorating the Italian victims of the disaster

The catastrophe had left such a legacy behind that it was selected as the main motif for a 2006 commemorative coin: the ten-Euro 50th anniversary of the catastrophe "Bois du Cazier" at Marcinelle coin. The obverse shows a portrait of a miner, with the mine "Bois du Cazier" in the background.

== See also ==
- European Coal and Steel Community, founded in 1951
- L'Innovation department Store fire (1967)
- Inferno Below
