= Boat Lifts on the Canal du Centre =

UNESCO World Heritage Site
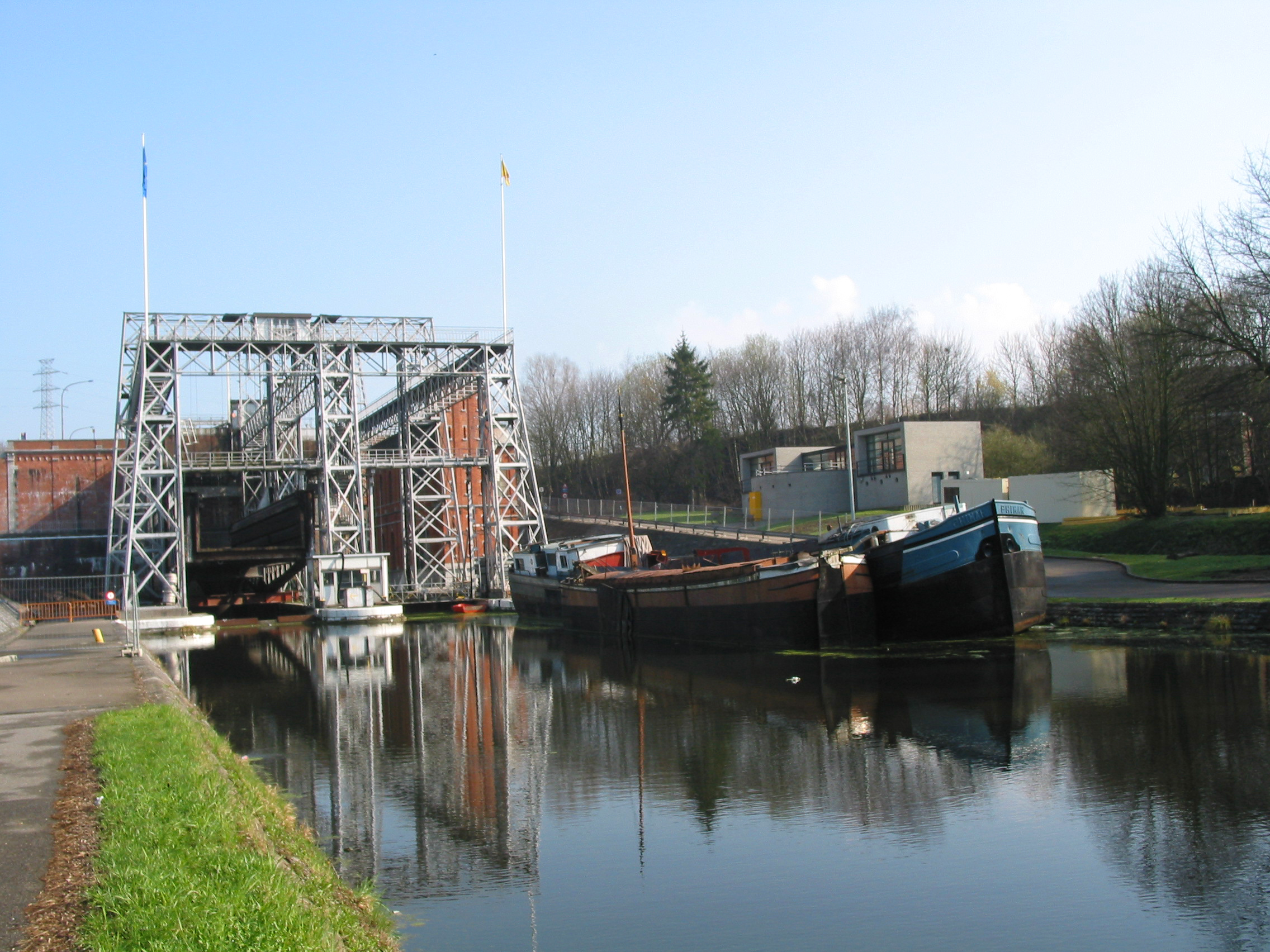
- Houdeng-Goegnies: lift no. 1

- Location within Belgium
- Official name: The Four Lifts on the Canal du Centre and their Environs, La Louvière and Le Roeulx (Hainaut)
- Location: Hainaut, Belgium
- Criteria: Cultural: (iii), (iv)
- Reference: 856
- Inscription: 1998 (22nd Session)
- Area: 67.3436 ha (166.410 acres)
- Buffer zone: 538.8133 ha (1,331.437 acres)
- Coordinates: 50°28′52″N 4°8′14″E

The lifts on the Canal du Centre are a series of four hydraulic boat lifts near the town of La Louvière in Belgium which are classified as a World Heritage Site by UNESCO. All four are located on the Canal du Centre in Belgium's historic sillon industriel industrial belt.

== History and current status ==
Along a particular 7 km (4.3 mi) stretch of the Canal du Centre, which connects the river basins of the Meuse and the Scheldt, the water level rises by 66.2 metres (217 ft). To overcome this difference, the 15.4 metres (51 ft) lift at Houdeng-Goegnies was opened in 1888. The other three lifts, each with a 16.93 metres (55.5 ft) rise, opened in 1917.

The elevators are double, consisting of two vertically mobile tanks or caissons, each supported in the centre by an iron column. The two columns are hydraulically linked in such a way that one caisson rises as the other descends, the weight of one counterbalancing the weight of the other.

These lifts were designed by Edwin Clark from the British company Clark, Stansfield & Clark. The lifts were part of the inspiration behind the Peterborough and Kirkfield Lift Locks in Canada. In the late 19th century Richard Birdsall Rogers visited the locks so as to understand and study possible ideas for a lift lock system.

These industrial monuments were designated by UNESCO as a World Heritage Site in 1998. The assemblage combines the four lifts with a variety of associated auxiliary buildings. Of the eight hydraulic lift locks built in the late 19th and early 20th century, the four on the Canal du Centre are the only ones still functioning in their original form.

Since 2002, operation of the lifts has been limited to recreational use. Commercial traffic now bypasses the old lifts and is handled by the enormous Strépy-Thieu boat lift, whose rise of 73m was the highest in the world upon completion.

Following an accident in January 2002, in which a malfunctioning elevator began rising as a motor barge was exiting, lift no. 1 was taken out of service. During the repair work, which began in 2005, a thorough restoration was undertaken.

== Lifts ==
Map showing the location of boat lifts numbered 1-4; "A" denotes the new Strépy-Thieu boat lift

Lift	Place Name	Coordinates	Rise	Photo
No. 1	Houdeng-Goegnies	50.4875°N 4.1758°E	15.40 m (50.5 ft)	
No. 2	Houdeng-Aimeries	50.4826°N 4.1423°E	16.93 m (55.5 ft)	
No. 3	Strépy-Bracquegnies	50.4813°N 4.1373°E	16.93 m (55.5 ft)	
No. 4	Thieu	50.4714°N 4.0945°E	16.93 m (55.5 ft)	
