= Major Mining Sites of Wallonia =

UNESCO World Heritage Site
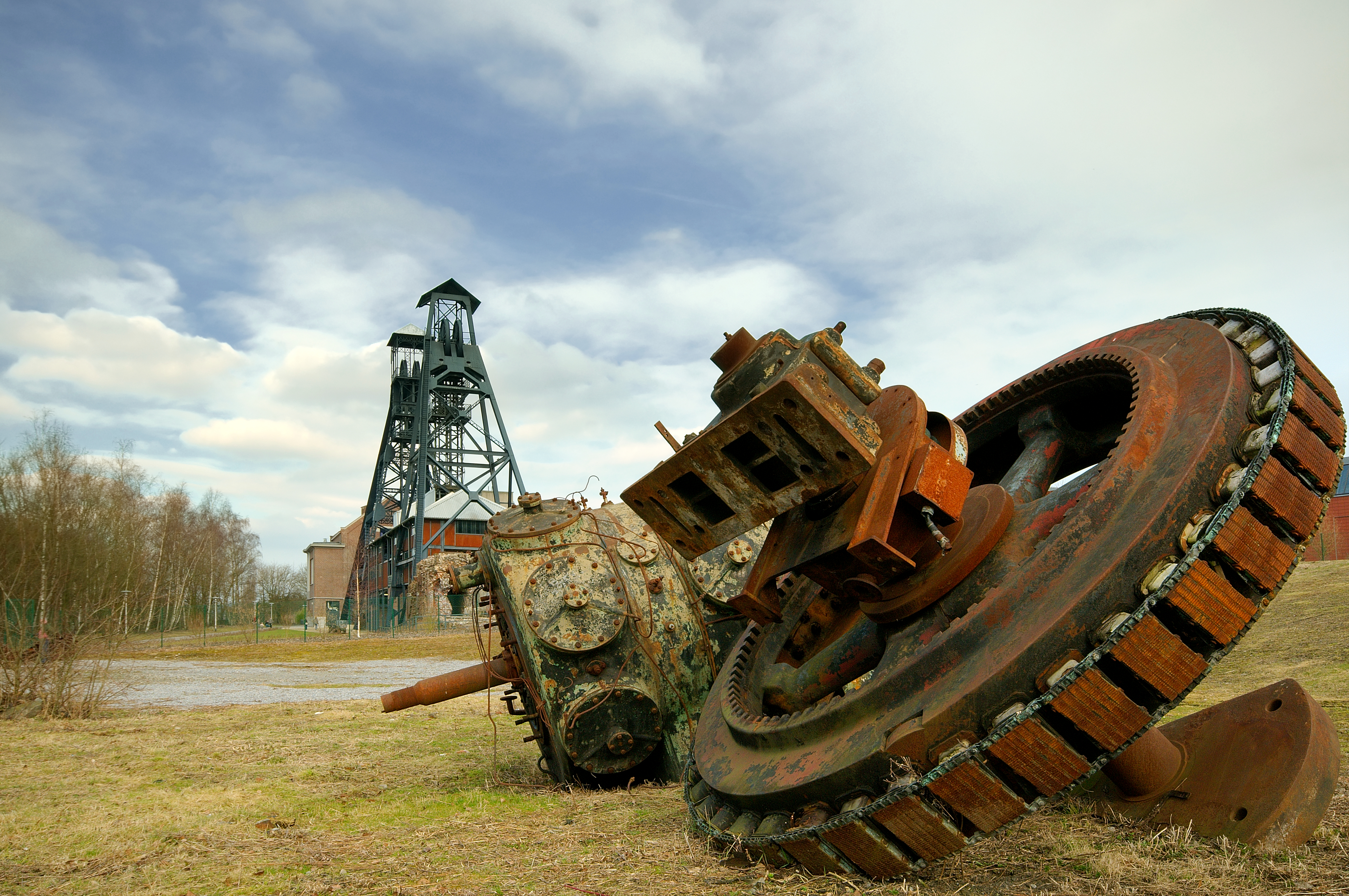
- Bois du Cazier
- Interactive map of Major Mining Sites of Wallonia
- Location: Wallonia, Belgium
- Criteria: Cultural: (ii), (iv)
- Reference: 1344rev
- Inscription: 2012 (36th Session)
- Area: 118.07 ha (291.8 acres)
- Buffer zone: 344.7 ha (852 acres)
- Website: www.sitesminiersmajeursdewallonie.be
- Coordinates: 50°26′7″N 3°50′18″E
- Location of Major Mining Sites of Wallonia in Belgium

The Major Mining Sites of Wallonia is a UNESCO World Heritage Site comprising four sites in Wallonia in southern Belgium associated with the Belgian coal mining industry of the 19th and 20th centuries. The four sites of the grouping, situated in the French-speaking Hainaut Province and Liège Province, comprise Grand-Hornu, the Bois-du-Luc, the Bois du Cazier and Blegny-Mine.

== Description ==
The site was recognized by the UNESCO commission in 2012 and is officially described:

The four sites of the property form a strip that is 170km long by 3 to 15 km, crossing Belgium from east to west. It consists of the best-preserved 19th- and 20th-century coal mining sites of the country. It features early examples of the utopian architecture from the early periods of the industrial era in Europe within a highly integrated, industrial and urban ensemble, notably the Grand-Hornu colliery and workers’ city designed by Bruno Renard in the first half of the 19th century. Bois-du-Luc includes numerous buildings erected from 1838 to 1909 and one of Europe’s oldest collieries dating back to the end of the 17th century. While the Walloon region had hundreds of collieries, most have lost their infrastructure, while the four components of the listed site retain a high measure of integrity.

== History ==
During the Industrial Revolution in the 19th century, mining and the heavy industry that relied on coal formed a major part of Belgium's economy. Most of this mining and industry took place in the sillon industriel ("industrial valley" in French), a strip of land running across the country where many of the largest cities in Wallonia are located. The named locations of this World Heritage Site are all situated in or near the area of the sillon industriel.

The mining sector in Belgium declined during the 20th century during deindustrialization and today the four mines listed are no longer operational. Today, they are each open to visitors as museums and are an important part of Belgian industrial heritage.

== Sites ==
Title	Image	Location	Description
Grand-Hornu		Hornu, Hainaut Province	Complex of industrial buildings associated with coal mining which dates to the early 19th century. It was one of the first examples of town planning and is one of the world's oldest company towns.
Bois-du-Luc		Houdeng-Aimeries, Hainaut Province	One of the oldest coal mines in Belgium, the mine closed in 1973. The site is preserved as an ecomuseum while the site is best known as a company town
Bois du Cazier		Marcinelle, Hainaut Province	A coal mine from 1822 to 1967, the Bois du Cazier is best known as the site of a major mining disaster of 1956 in which 262 miners, mostly Italian migrant workers, were killed.
Blegny-Mine		Blegny, Liège Province	A major coal mine in eastern Belgium; in 1980, it was the last to close in the province.

== See also ==
- Belgium in "the long nineteenth century"
- Industrial archaeology
- The International Committee for the Conservation of the Industrial Heritage
