= Grand-Hornu =

World Heritage Site and exhibition centre

Coordinates: 50°26′7″N 3°50′22″E

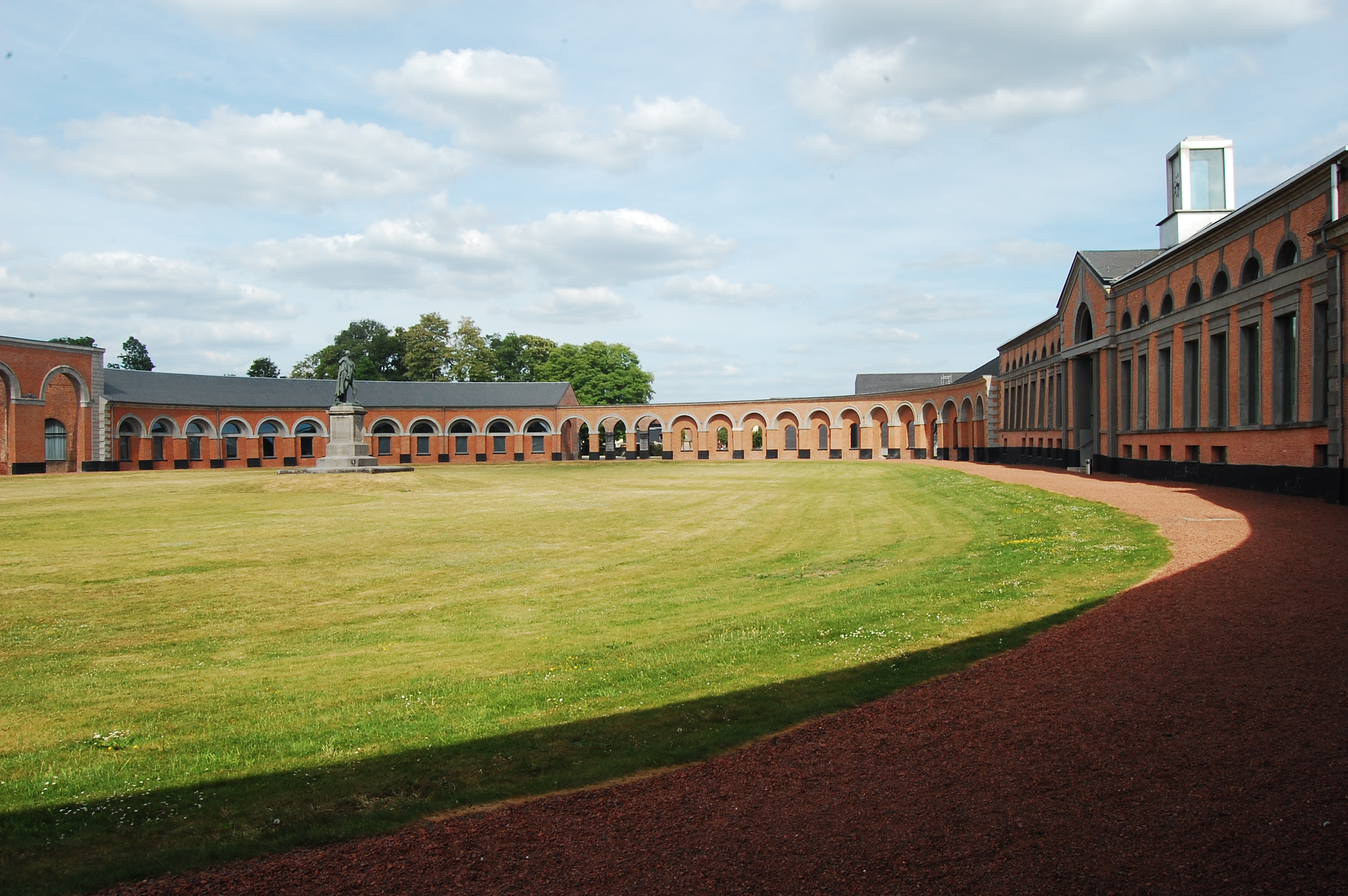
View of the central plaza at the Grand-Hornu

Grand-Hornu is an old industrial coal mining complex and company town (cité ouvrière) in Hornu (Boussu), near Mons, in Belgium. It was built by Henri De Gorge between 1810 and 1830. It is a unique example of functional town-planning. Today it is owned by the province of Hainaut, which houses temporary exhibitions in the buildings. It is one of the four industrial sites which were listed by UNESCO as a World Heritage Site in 2012.
