= Bois-du-Luc =

Ancient coal mine in Belgium

Coordinates: 50.470461°N 4.149881°E

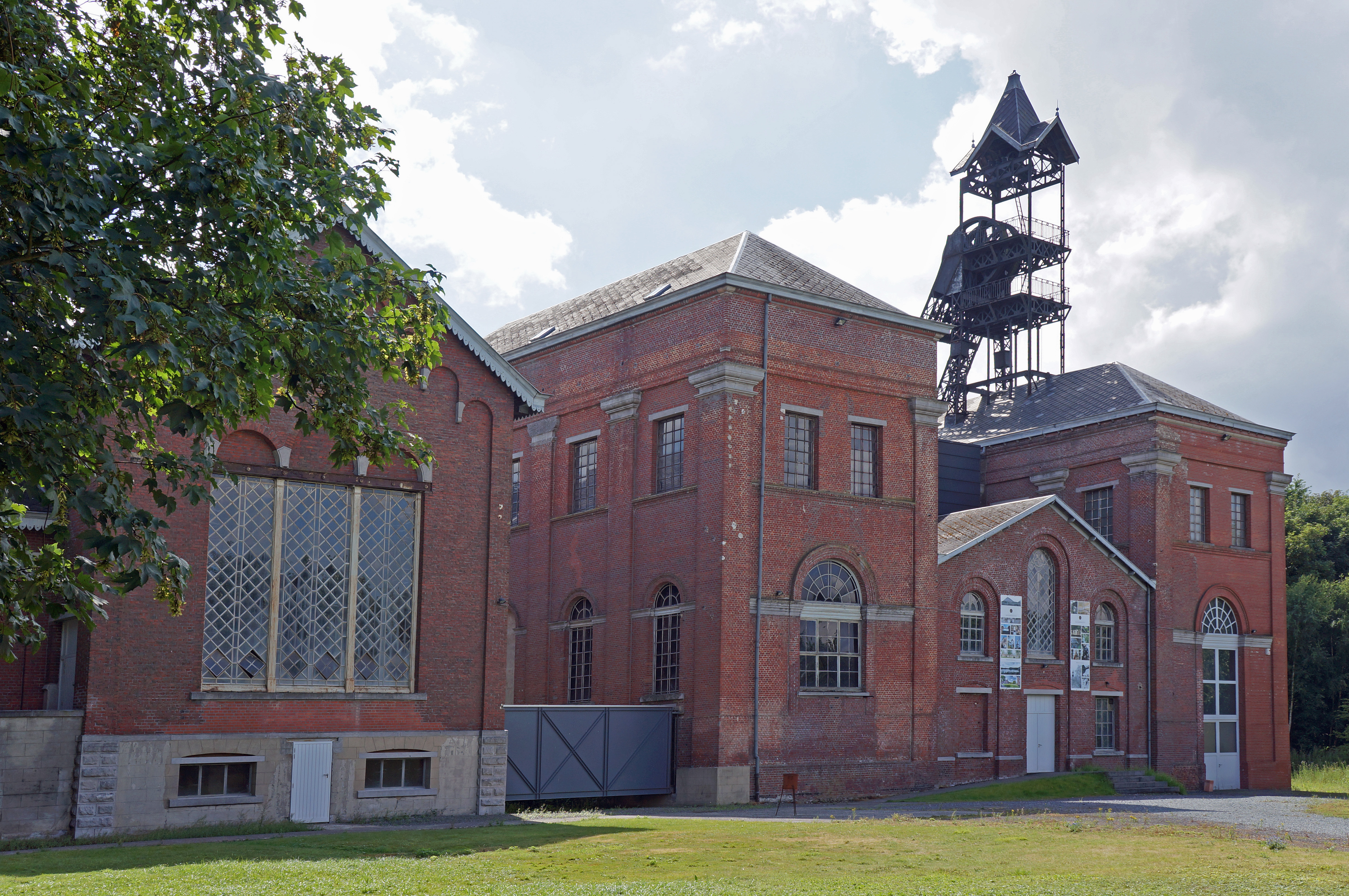
Modern view of the Bois-du-Luc

The Bois-du-Luc was a coal mine in Houdeng-Aimeries, near La Louvière, in Belgium which today is preserved as an industrial heritage site. As well as the site of the headquarters of the Société des Charbonnages de Bois-du-Luc et d'Havre, the Bois du Luc was the site of the Saint Emmanuel Pit (Fosse Saint-Emmanuel) which belonged to the company. The Fosse Saint-Emmanuel was one of the oldest mines in Belgium, with recorded activity dating back to 1685. The company ceased mining in 1973.

The Bois-du-Luc is particularly known for the surrounding company town (cité ouvrière) which was created for the mine works during the 19th century and is today one of the most notable surviving remnants of industrial paternalism in Belgium. It includes workers' housing which dates from the 1830s and covers approximately 2 hectares (4.9 acres).

The site, run as an ecomuseum since 1983, features on the European Route of Industrial Heritage and is one of the four Walloon mining sites listed by UNESCO as a World Heritage Site under the Major Mining Sites of Wallonia listing.

== Images ==
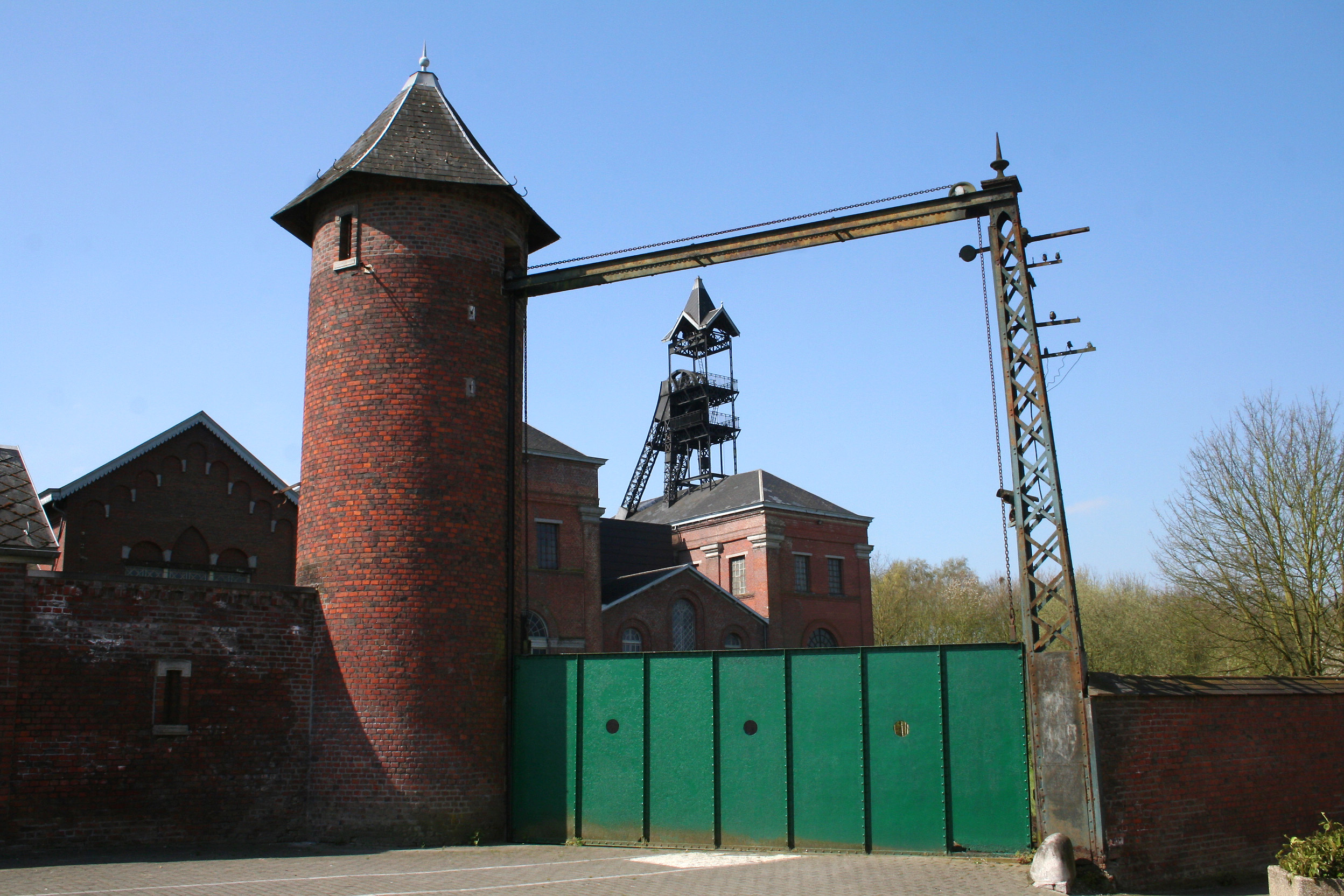
Gates to the Fosse Saint Emmanuel

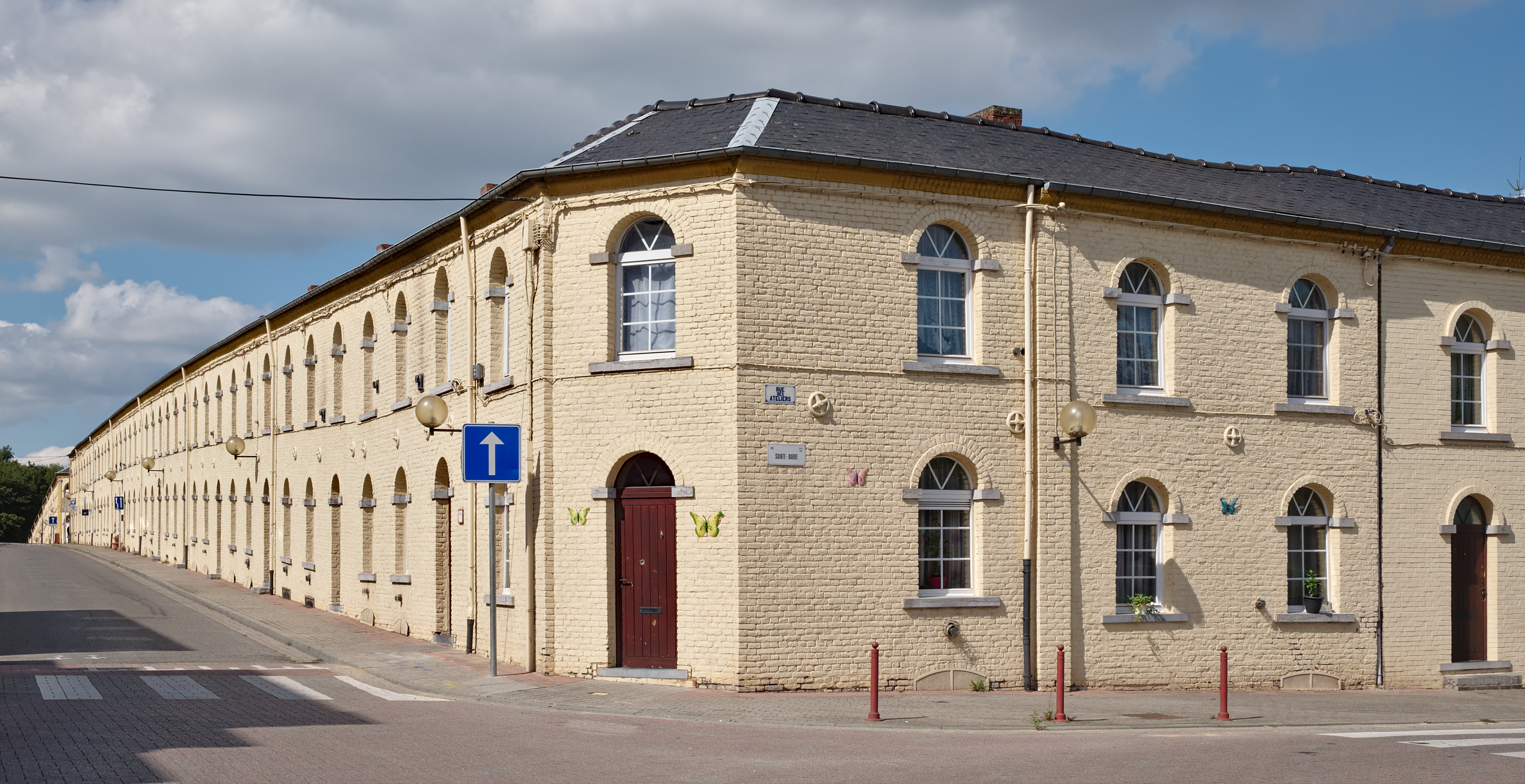
Workers' housing

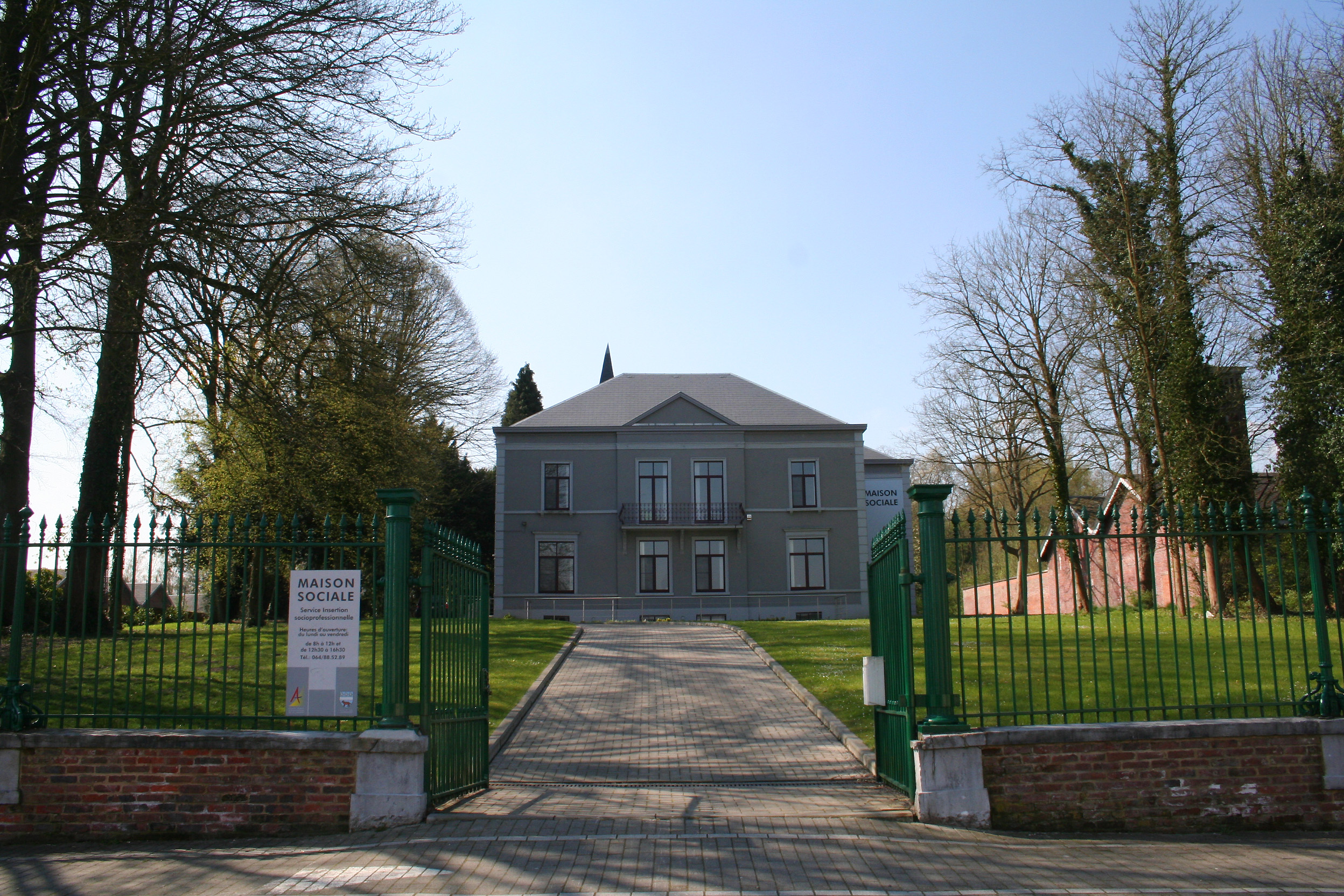
Director's house

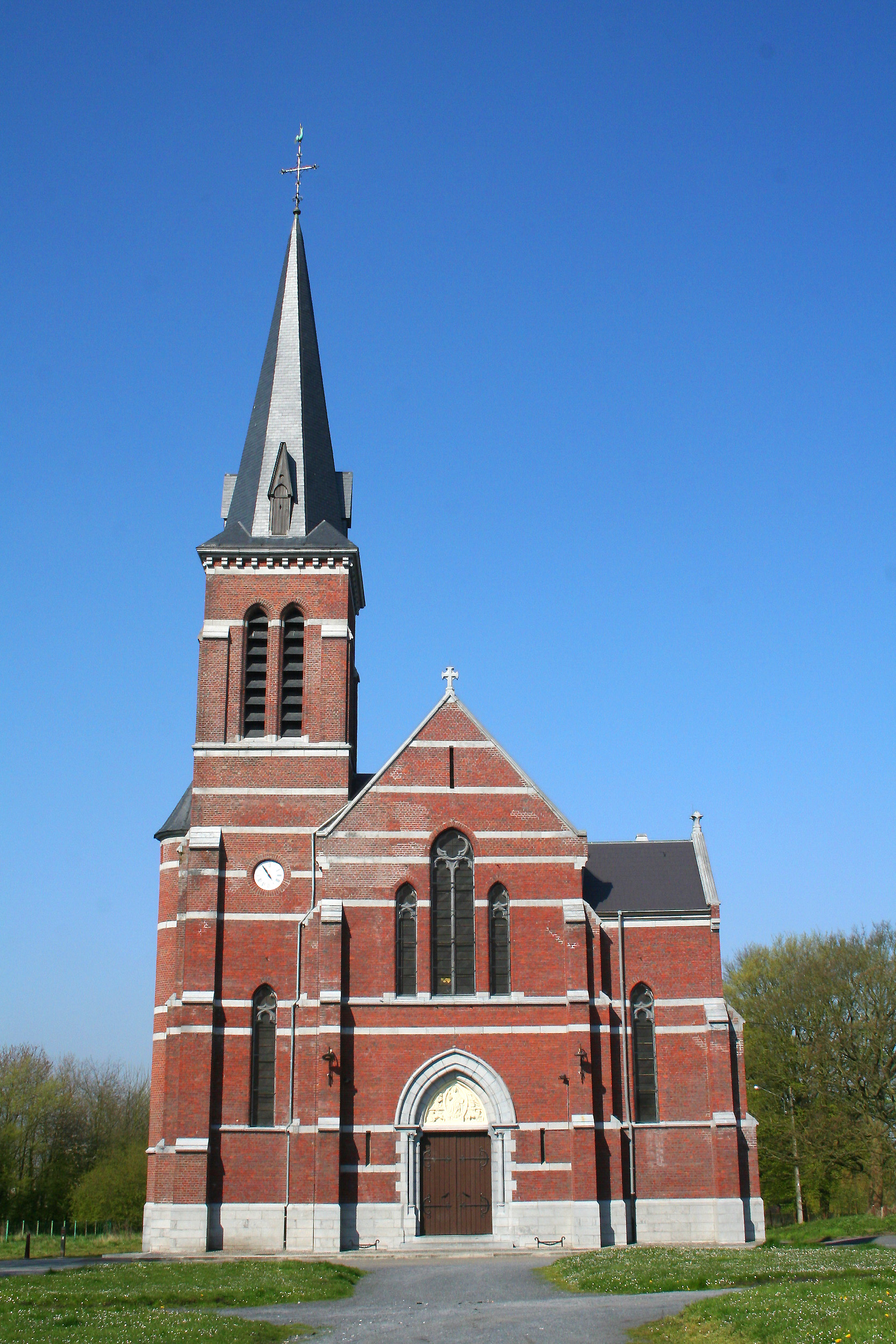
Church of Saint Barbara

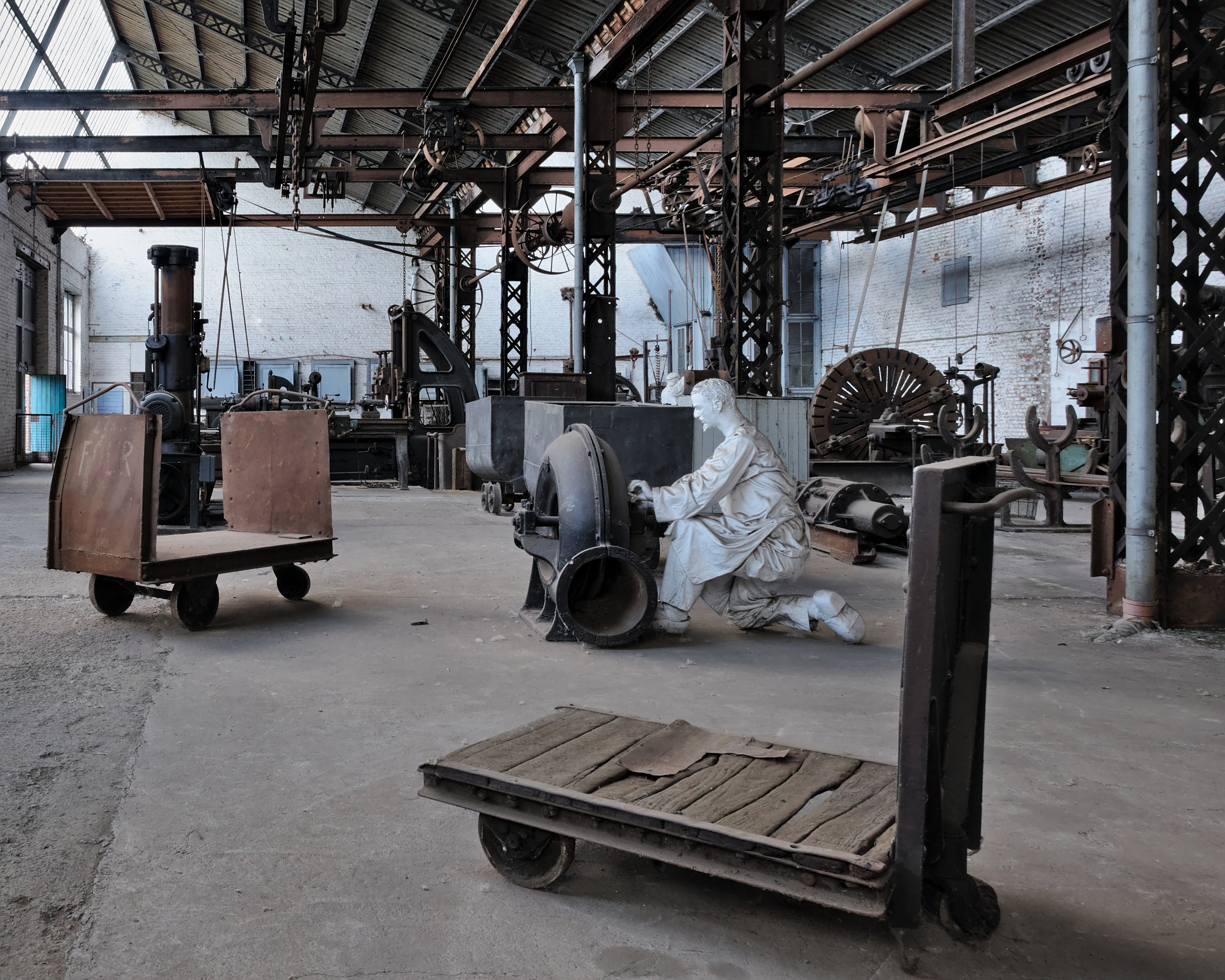
Foundry
