= Bois du Cazier =

Coal mine near Charleroi

Coordinates: 50°22′52″N 04°26′36″E

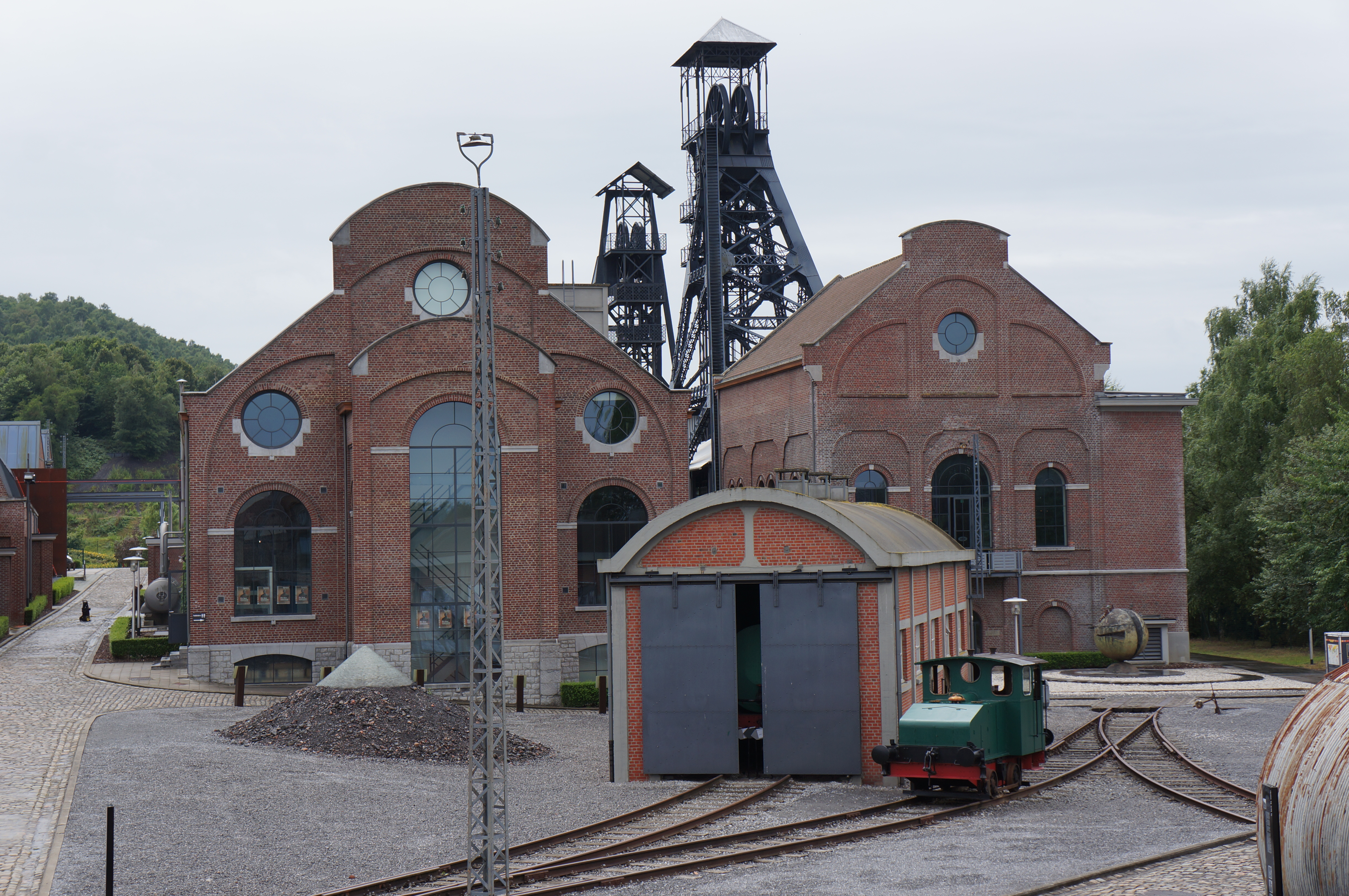
View of the Bois du Cazier site, with the distinctive headframes beyond the mine buildings

The Bois du Cazier (French pronunciation: [bwa dy kazje]) was a coal mine in what was then the town of Marcinelle, near Charleroi, in Belgium which today is preserved as an industrial heritage site. It is best known as the location of a major mining disaster that took place on August 8, 1956 in which 262 men, including a large number of Italian labourers, were killed. Aside from memorials to the disaster, the site features a small woodland park, preserved headframes and buildings, as well as an Industrial Museum and Glass Museum. The museum features on the European Route of Industrial Heritage and is one of the four Walloon mining sites listed by UNESCO as a World Heritage Site in 2012.

== History ==
The history of coal mining on the site of the Bois du Cazier dates back to a concession awarded by royal decree on 30 September 1822; a transcription error caused the name of the site to be changed from Bois de Cazier. After 1898, the site was owned by the charbonnages d'Amercœur company and operated by the Société anonyme du Charbonnage du Bois du Cazier. The site had two mine shafts reaching 765 metres (2,510 ft) and 1,035 metres (3,396 ft) deep. A third shaft, known as the Foraky shaft, was begun in the mid-1950s. By 1955, the mine produced 170,557 tonnes (167,863 long tons; 188,007 short tons) of coal annually and employed a total of 779 workers, many of whom were not Belgian but migrant workers from Italy and elsewhere. They were housed by the mining companies, which in reality meant they moved into Nissen huts in former prisoner of war camps in the region. On 8 August 1956, a major mining accident occurred and a fire destroyed the mine; 262 workers of 12 nationalities were killed. In the aftermath of the disaster, Italian immigration stopped and mining safety regulations were revised all across Europe and a Mines Safety Commission established. Full production at the Bois du Cazier resumed the following year. The company was liquidated in January 1961 and the mine finally closed in December 1967. It was listed as a national monument on 28 May 1990 and opened as a museum in 2002.

=== Marcinelle disaster of 1956 ===
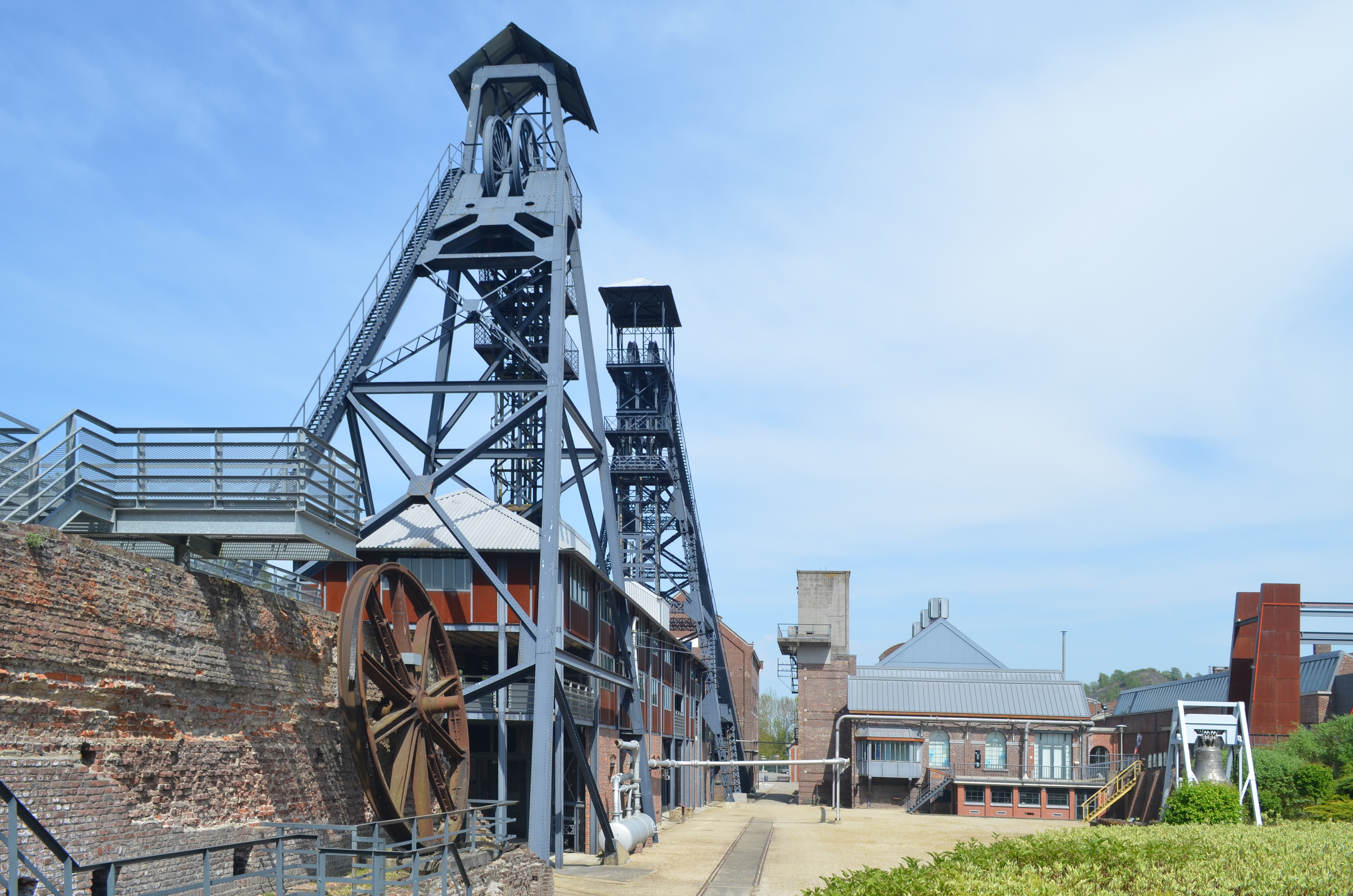
View of the two headframes at the Bois du Cazier

On 8 August 1956, a major mining disaster occurred at the Bois du Cazier. An accident began at 8:10 AM when the hoist mechanism in one of the shafts was started before the coal wagon had been completely loaded into the cage. Electric cables ruptured, starting an underground fire within the shaft. The moving cage also ruptured oil and air pipes which made the fire worse and destroyed much of the winch mechanism. Smoke and carbon monoxide spread down the mine, killing all the miners trapped by the fire.

Despite an attempted rescue from the surface, only 13 of the miners who had been underground at the time of the accident survived. 262 were killed, making the mining accident the worst in Belgian history. Because of the guest worker programme then in force, only 96 killed in the accident were Belgian nationals; in total 12 nationalities were represented among the dead, including 136 Italians. The remains of the last miners, trapped at the bottom of the mine, were only found on 23 August 1956. The excavators famously reported that they were "all corpses" (tutti cadaveri) inside the mine.

The disaster is considered a major moment in Belgian and Italian post-war history and was the subject of a 2003 documentary film, Inferno Below, which won an award at the Festival International de Programmes Audiovisuels.

== Museums ==
Since March 2002, the Bois du Cazier has been open to the public as a museum complex. Most of the original site of the mine is preserved except the derelict Foraky headframe, dating to the 1960s, which was demolished in 2004. The mine buildings house a small Industrial Museum (Musée d'Industrie), displaying artefacts relating to Belgium's industrial history. The Glass Museum of Charleroi (Musée du Verre de Charleroi) also reopened in the same site in 2007, displaying its collection of historic glassware. There are several spaces with memorials to the 1956 disaster. The slag heaps around the mine have been landscaped and can also be visited by the public.

The museum is one of the four sites inscribed as a UNESCO World Heritage Site under the Major Mining Sites of Wallonia listing. It also features on the European Route of Industrial Heritage. In 2006, the Bois du Cazier received 46,000 visitors.

== See also ==
- Tiberio Murgia, Italian actor who worked at the mine in the mid-1950s
- Salvatore Adamo, Belgian singer whose father migrated from Italy to work at Marcinelle
- Elio Di Rupo, Belgian Prime Minister and the son of an Italian miner
- Mining accident, including a list
