= Blegny-Mine =

Former coal mine in Trembleur, Belgium

Coordinates: 50.6889°N 5.7180°E

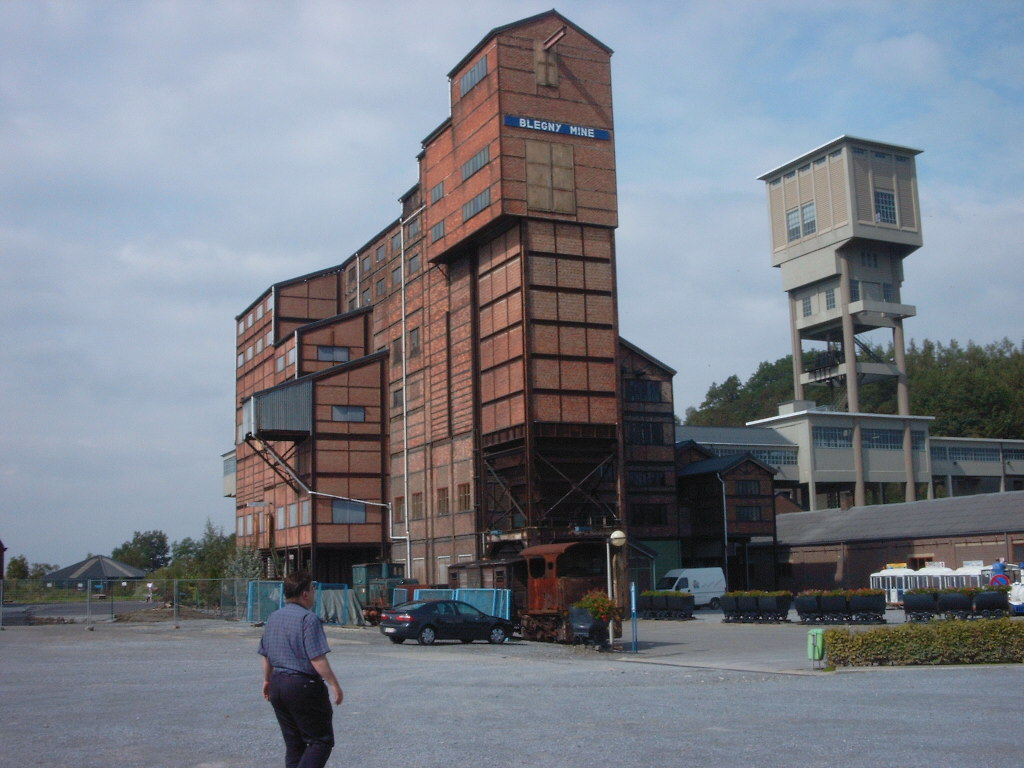
The coal washing tower and production shaft at Blegny-Mine

Blegny-Mine was a coal mine in Trembleur, near Liège, in Belgium which today is preserved as an industrial heritage site and show mine. The museum features on the European Route of Industrial Heritage and is one of the four historical mines in Wallonia listed by UNESCO as a World Heritage Site in 2012.

Mining at the site was begun by the monks of Val-Dieu Abbey in the 16th century. The first mine shaft was sunk in 1779 and expanded throughout the 19th and early 20th centuries. In 1883, two concession companies in the region merged but went bankrupt in 1887. Mining at the site was taken up by the Société anonyme des Charbonnages d'Argenteau in 1919. The mine's headframe was destroyed by the Belgian Army in 1940 and many of the surviving features of the site date to the post-World War II period. At its height in 1970, it produced 232,000 tonnes (228,000 long tons; 256,000 short tons) of coal per year and employed 680 workers. It was one of the last active coal mines in the Province of Liège, closing after subsidies were withdrawn following the 1973 oil crisis, in 1980.

The mine was transformed into a museum soon after its closure. Today the museum receives between 140,000 and 160,000 visitors each year.
