= Flemish immigration to Wallonia =

Flemish immigration to Wallonia was an important phenomenon in the History of Belgium during the second half of the nineteenth century. Attracted by better economic prospects in Wallonia, one of the three regions of Belgium, people from Flanders migrated south in sizable numbers. Flanders did not really take part in the first Industrial Revolution, and was described by Belgian sociolinguist Kas Deprez as "poor and backward in the 19th century".

Census figures from between 1866 and 1910, published by historian Yves Quairiaux, show the size and importance of the migration.

== Figures of the Flemish immigration ==
Census	Arrondissements ([Provinces])	Ath [Hainaut]	Charleroi [Hainaut]	Mons [Hainaut]	Soignies [Hainaut]	Thuin [Hainaut]	Tournai [Hainaut]	Huy [Liège]	Liège [Liège]	Verviers [Liège]	Waremme [Liège]	Walloon Brabant	Luxemburg	Namur
1866	Total population of Flemings	88.811 1.877 2,11%	212.446 9.044 4,26%	189.168 1.575 0,83%	100.869 7.890 7,91%	96.283 485 0,50%	176.653 6.342 3,59%	80.874 433 0,54%	284.668 20.399 7,17%	128.041 6.300 4,92%	49.130 2.500 5,09%	150.162 2.960 5,09%	199.910 ..... 645 .... 0,32%	302.778 2.100 0,69%
1880	Total population of Flemings	90.080 1.738 1,93%	212.466 9.044 4,26%	189.168 1.575 0,83%	118.227 8.905 7,51%	108.823 6.342 3,59%	184.177 9.380 5,09%	89.969 431 0,48%	351.860 23.984 6,79%	151.238 6.021 3,98%	55.444 2.338 4,21%	147.889 3.127 2,11%	209.118 ... 916 ........ 0,44	322.654 2.606 0,81%
1890	Total population of Flemings	88.554 2.638 2,98%	347.179 15.912 4,58%	227.835 2.921 1,28%	129.323 11.526 8,91%	114.496 1.078 0,94%	183.751 17.901 9,74%	98.847 753 0,76%	419.163 39.537 9,43%	166.996 5.818 3,48%	57.361 3.359 5,86%	162.571 6.397 3,93%	211.711 ... 842 ..... 0,40%	333.471 4.198 1,26%
1900	Total population of Flemings	88.658 3.556 4,01%	377.590 21.267 5,63%	245.244 3.968 1,62%	143.702 15.114 10,52%	125.298 1.806 1,44%	200.900 25.626 12,76%	100.387 876 0,87%	475.624 40.829 8,58%	169.780 4.976 2,93%	50.090 3.670 6,21%	169.219 7.243 4,28%	219.210 ... 1.225 ... 0,56%	346.512 4.035 1,16%
1910	Total population of Flemings	87.707 2.958 3,37%	421.024 26.986 6,41%	260.780 4.070 1,56%	156.484 15.044 9,61%	137.522 3.327 2,42%	215.860 33.455 15,50%	103.385 971 0,94%	528.728 41.848 7,91%	168.893 4.914 2,89%	63.842 4.441 6,96%	178.697 8.372 4,69%	231.215 ... 1.546 ... 0,67%	362.846 5.169 1,42%

These figures correspond to the figures of the book (translated in French) of a Flemish journalist Pascal Verbeken. Both authors agree that this phenomenon was very important in the nation building or in any case of the identity building of the two greatest Belgian population, the Walloons and the Flemings. Among the industrial areas along the Sillon industriel, the Borinage (in the West of Wallonia) and the region of Verviers (in the East) are less concerned by the phenomenon. The most important area of the Flemish immigration are three basins of the industrial Wallonia: Charleroi, Liège and the Centre around La Louvière. In the period of the census published by Quairiaux, almost 500,000 Flemings came in Wallonia to find a job in the industry.

The Belgian census calculate the number of Belgians who speak French, Flemish (now Dutch), and German. Quairiaux estimates the number of the Flemings in Wallonia on the basis that in Wallonia in this period only the Flemings were Flemish-speaking or bilingual (Flemish-French). They quickly adopted the regional culture and the regional language (more Walloon or Picard than French in any case in the beginning).

== Reception of the Flemings by the Walloons ==
Walloon literature (as a regional language), did have its golden age during the peak of the Flemish immigration: That period saw an efflorescence of Walloon literature, plays and poems primarily, and the founding of many theaters and periodicals. And that is mainly in the plays that the Flemish people has been shown. Quairiaux learned more than 200 plays where he tried to describe the image of the Flemish people for Walloons. In this period plays were almost the only popular show in Wallonia.
