= Centre region, Hainaut =

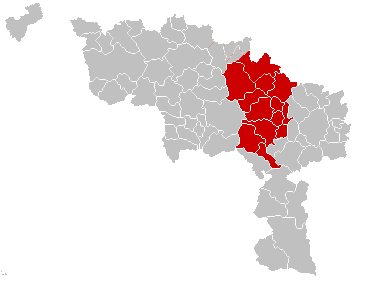
Location of the region within Hainaut

The Région du Centre or simply Centre is a former industrial region within the province of Hainaut in Wallonia, Belgium. It forms part of the wider industrial region known as the Sillon industriel.

It is located between the cities of Mons (the Borinage), Charleroi and Thuin (the Pays Noir) and Brabant. Its most important town is La Louvière. The region gives its name to the Canal du Centre, between Mons and Thieu, which is a village near La Louvière.

The region had its own newspaper from 1945 to 1987, L'Echo du Centre. There is also a regional television station, Antenne Centre.

== Municipalities ==
The following municipalities are usually assumed to be within the region.

- Anderlues
- Binche
- Braine-le-Comte
- Chapelle-lez-Herlaimont
- Écaussinnes
- Estinnes
- La Louvière
- Le Rœulx
- Manage
- Merbes-le-Château
- Morlanwelz
- Seneffe
- Soignies
