= Pays Noir =

Former industrial region in Belgium

Coordinates: 50.431°N 4.433°E

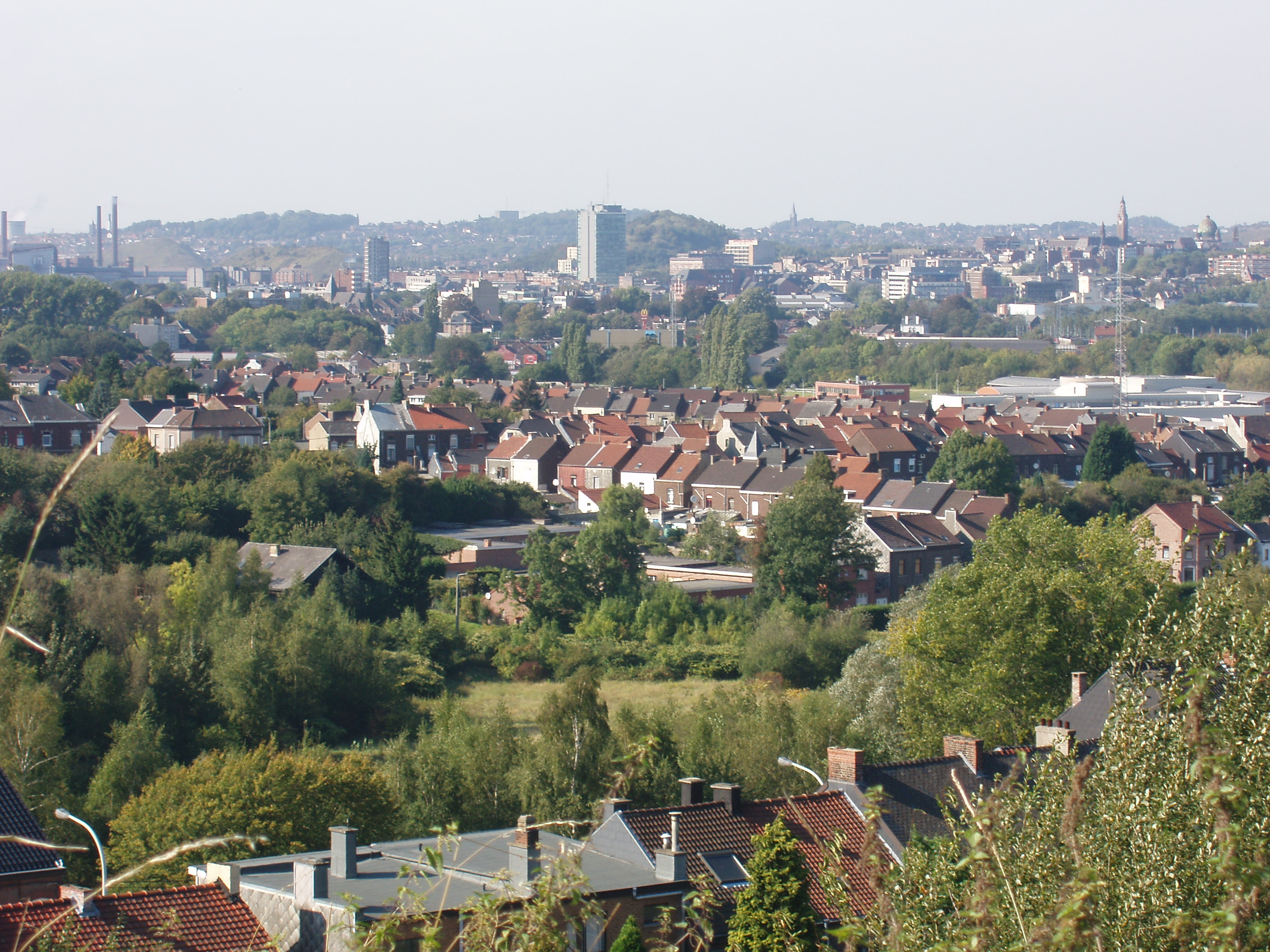
Photo of Charleroi from Couilet

The Pays Noir (French for 'black country') refers to a region of Belgium, centered on the city of Charleroi in the province of Hainaut in Belgium so named for the geological presence of coal. In the 19th century the region rapidly industrialised first with coal mines, then with related industries such as steel manufacture and glass production. The Pays Noir former part of the wider industrial region known as the Sillon industriel.

== Description ==
The region, centred on Charleroi, also known as the Pays de Charleroi includes the communes of Aiseau-Presles, Charleroi, Châtelet, Courcelles, Farciennes, Fleurus, Fontaine-l'Évêque, Gerpinnes, Les Bons Villers and Pont-à-Celles.

In the west, the Pays Noir borders the Centre-region around the town of La Louvière. Geologically, the region - as well as the other coal bearing areas in Belgium - lies on the northern edge of the Rhenish Massif.

== See also ==
- Sillon industriel, the industrial valley of Belgium, the western part of which lies in the Pays Noir
- Borinage
- Black Country, a similar early industrial region in the English Midlands
