= Sillon industriel =

Former industrial region in Belgium

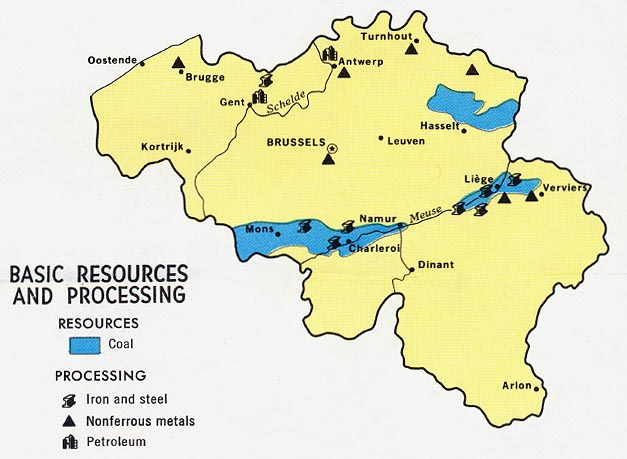
A 1968 CIA map of resources in Belgium. The industrial belt runs from Mons in the west to Verviers in the east. The Meuse is labelled but not the Sambre, which flows into it. The Haine and Vesdre are too minor to be shown.

The Sillon industriel (French: [sijɔ̃ ɛ̃dystʁijɛl], lit. 'industrial furrow') describes a coal-rich region running through Belgium which emerged as the core of the country's heavy industry during the Industrial Revolution.

The region itself runs across the region of Wallonia, passing from Dour, the region of Borinage, in the west, to Verviers in the east, passing along the way through Mons, La Louvière (the Centre), Charleroi (the Pays Noir), Namur, Huy, and Liège. It follows a continuous stretch of valleys of the rivers Haine, Sambre, Meuse and Vesdre, and has an area of roughly 1000 km^{2}.

The strip is also known as the Sambre and Meuse valley, as those are the main rivers, or the Haine-Sambre-Meuse-Vesdre valley, which includes two smaller rivers. (French: sillon Sambre-et-Meuse or sillon Haine-Sambre-Meuse-Vesdre). It is also called the Dorsale wallonne, meaning "Walloon [industrial] backbone".

It is less defined by physical geography, and is more a description of human geography and resources. As heavy industry is no longer the prevailing feature of the Belgian economy, it is now more common to refer to the area as a former industrial belt.

Around two-thirds of the population of Wallonia lives in the area – over two million people. Its main stretch is sometimes called the Charleroi-Liège valley, which connects Charleroi and Liège. Some see it as a Walloon metropolis, although it is linear rather than multi-directional sprawl.

== History ==
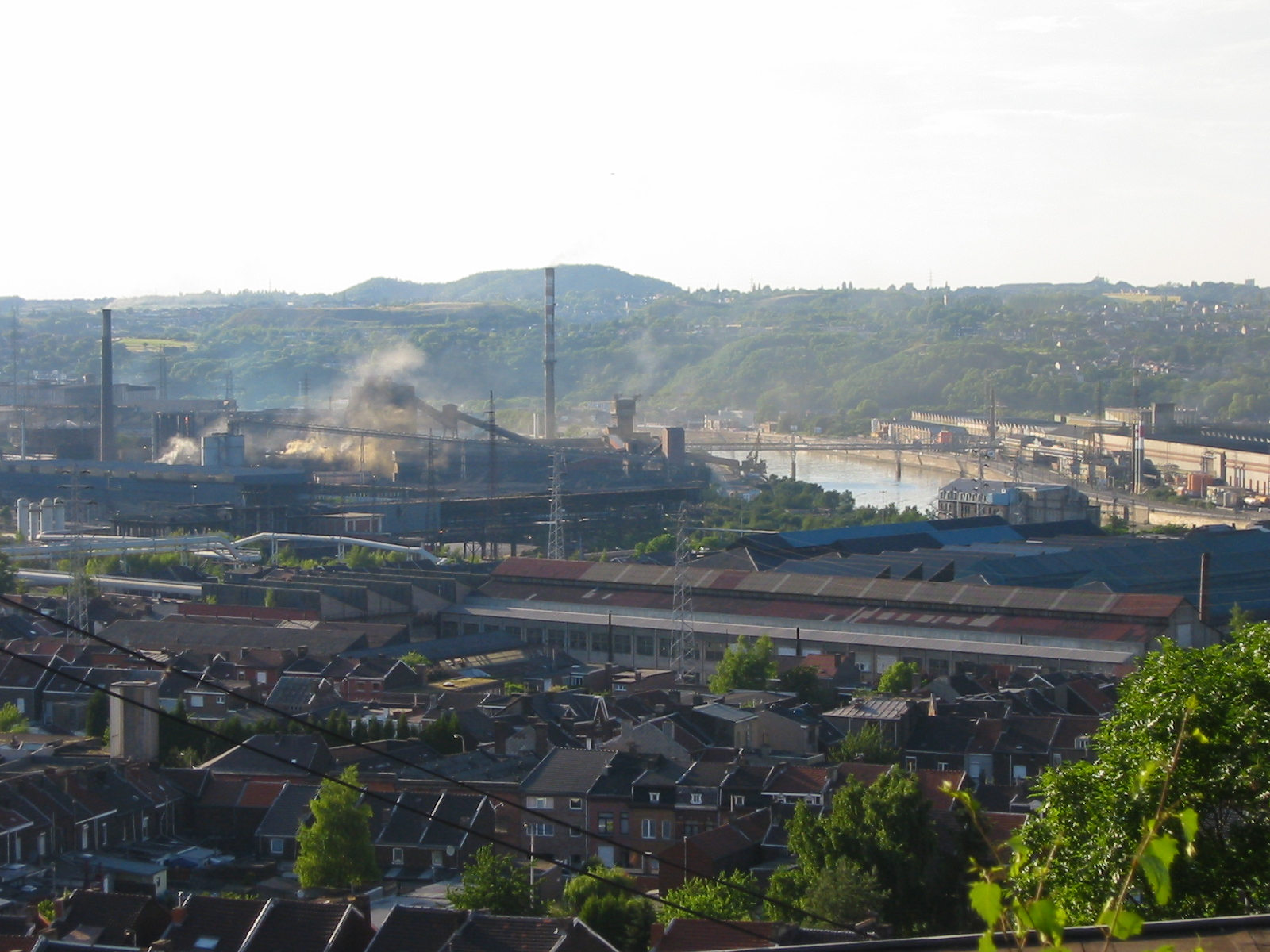
Steelmaking along the Meuse at Ougrée, near Liège

The sillon industriel was the first fully industrialized area in continental Europe, experiencing its first industrialisation wave from 1800 to 1820. Its industry brought much wealth to Belgium, and it was the economic core of the country. This continued until after World War II, when the importance of Belgian steel, coal and industry began to diminish. The region's economy shifted towards extraction of non-metallic raw materials such as glass and soda, which lasted until the 1970s. The days of prosperity were gone, however, and a trend of unemployment and partial economic dependence on the formerly poorer Flemish Region began, and continues to this day.

The region has seen numerous general strikes, some with social aims, some with political aims. In 1886, due to economic crisis, lowering of salaries and unemployment; in 1893, 1902 and 1913, as a struggle for universal suffrage. More strikes occurred in 1932 and 1936, with a strike in 1950 on the question of the return of Leopold III to the Belgian throne. The region was at the heart of the general strike of winter 1960-1961, which helped Wallonia to gain autonomy. It was also the site of the first dechristianisation in Belgium, and the most ferocious opposition to Leopold III's return to the throne.

== Today ==
The region is the base of the Belgian francophone Socialist Party (Parti Socialiste) in Wallonia. Some of the region qualifies for Objective 1 or Objective 2 status under the Regional policy of the European Union because of its low GDP per capita. This is to encourage growth in the area. This is rare in Western Europe.

Four former industrial sites in the region had been recognized by the UNESCO commission as a UNESCO World Heritage Site, the Major Mining Sites of Wallonia, in 2012.

== See also ==
- Black Country – British equivalent in the Midlands of England around Birmingham.
- Flemish diamond – Flanders's loose equivalent
- Rust Belt – Similar region in the United States
