= Borinage =

- Region of Belgium
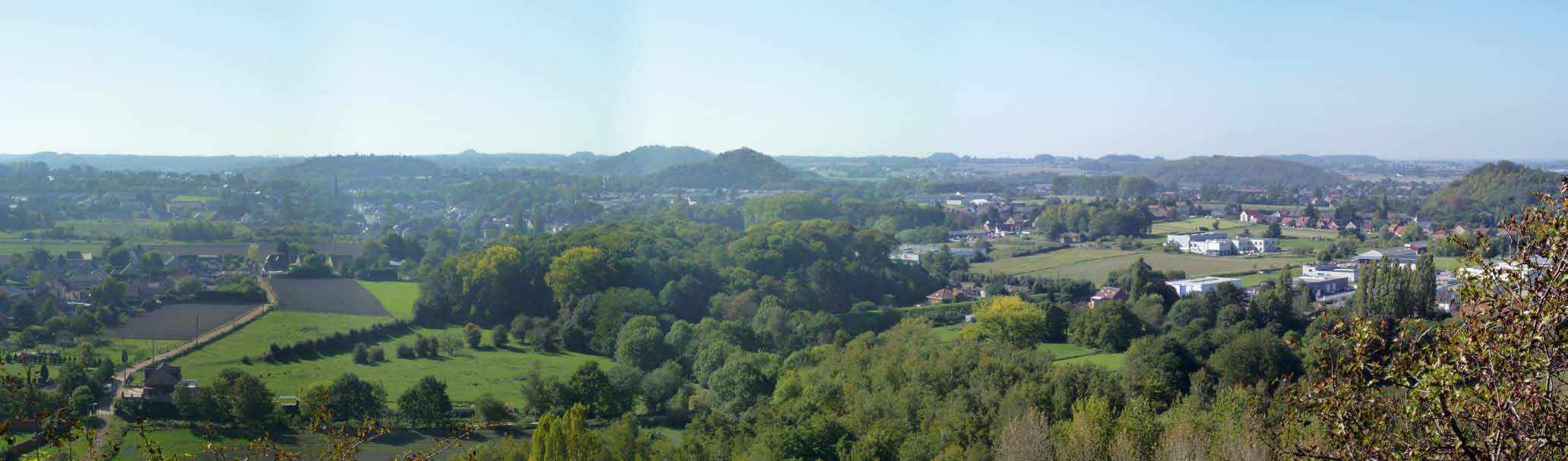
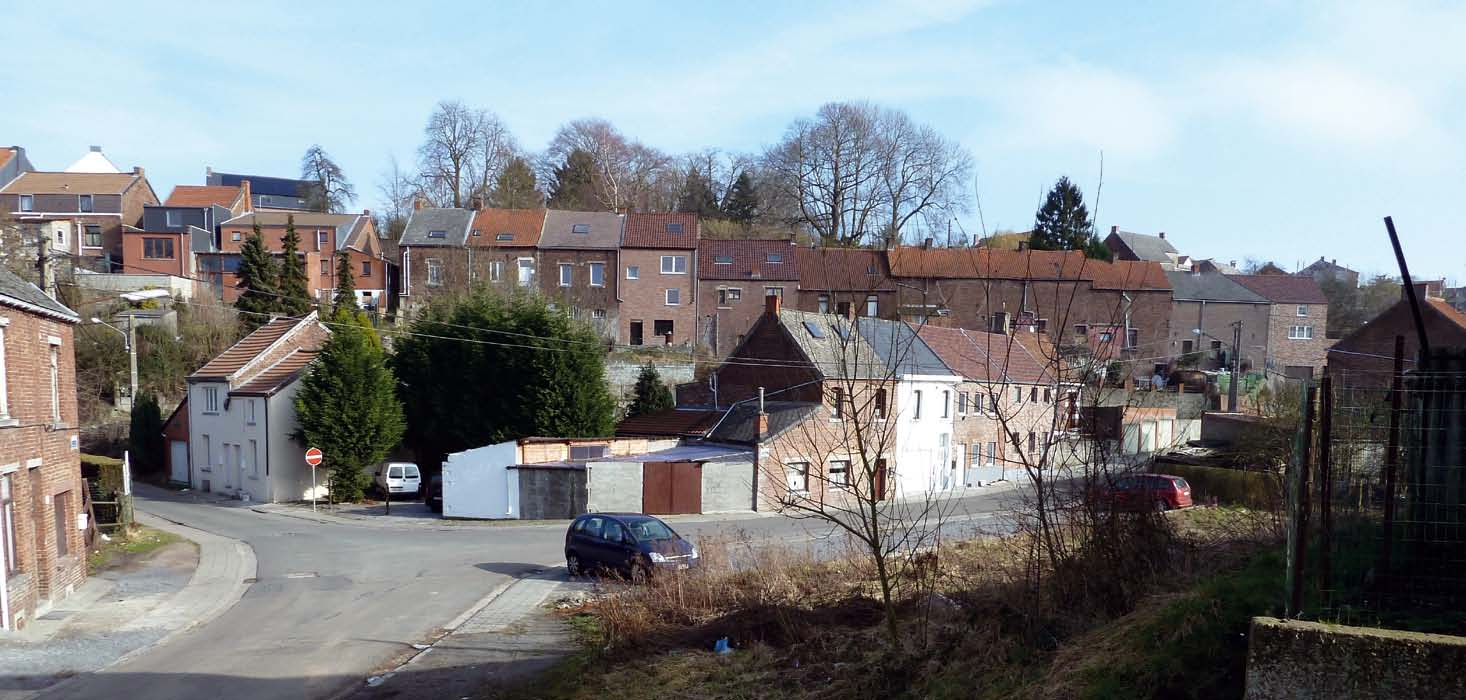
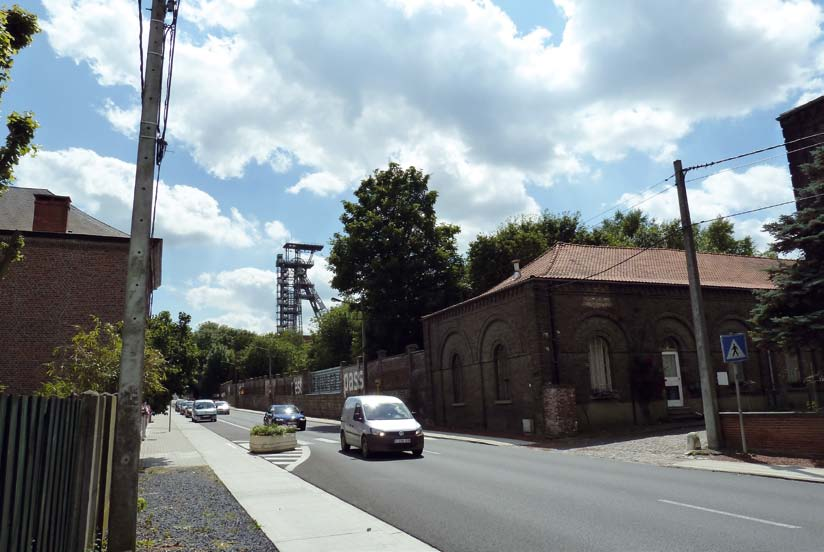
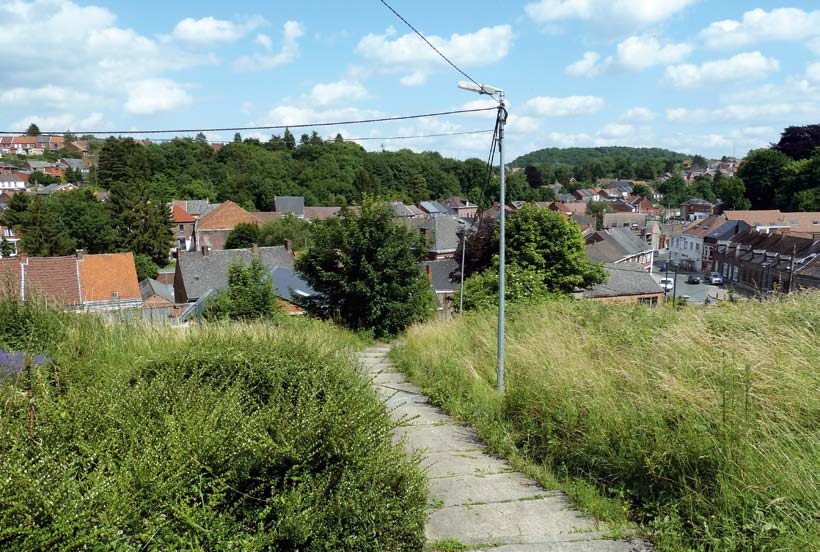
- Typical views of the Borinage

- Location in Belgium
- Coordinates: 50°26′N 3°50′E
- Country: Belgium
- Region: Wallonia
- Province: Hainaut

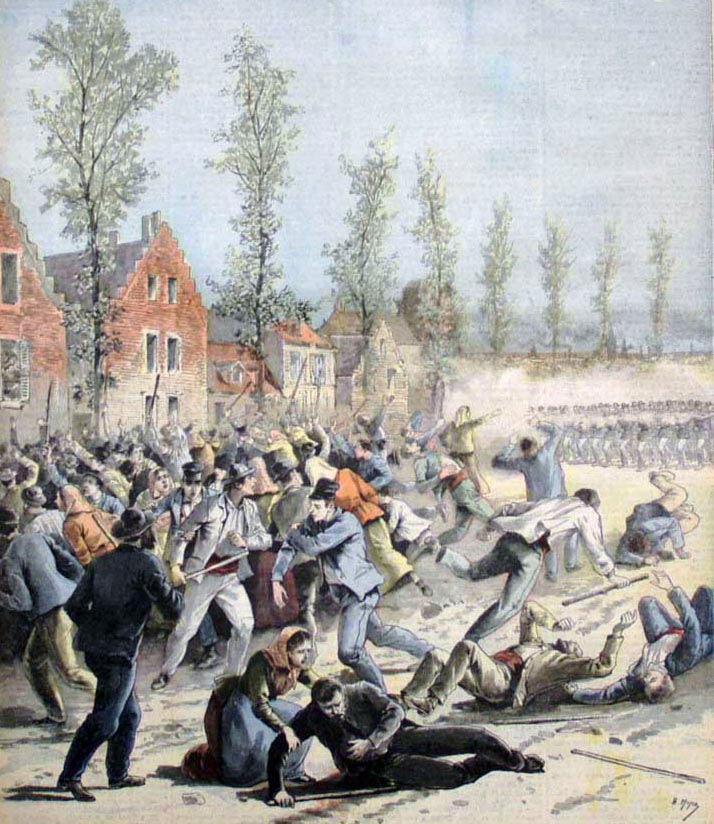
Borains (from Jemappes) fired upon by the civic guard of Mons during the Belgian general strike of 1893 (Le Petit Journal, May 1893)

The Borinage (French pronunciation: [bɔʁinaʒ]) is an area in the Walloon province of Hainaut in Belgium. The name derives from the coal mines of the region, bores, meaning mineshafts in local dialect. The region formed part of the wider industrial belt known as the Sillon industriel. In French, the inhabitants of the Borinage are called Borains.

The provincial capital, Mons, is located in the east of the Borinage, but there was a great sociological difference between the inhabitants of Mons and the Borains of the villages around Mons.

== Rise and fall of coal ==
"From the 18th century to 1850, the economy of thirty municipalities in the Borinage was founded on coal mining. Between 1822 and 1829, production more than doubled in that region i.e. from 602,000 to 1,260,000 tons. That was more than the total production of France and Germany at the time. The Borinage exported its coal mostly to France and Flanders."

In 1878, several fossils of iguanodons were found: this find was unique because complete skeletons were present. When this area was occupied by the Germans in World War I, a few attempts were made to reopen the mine where the skeletons had been found. However, this never succeeded and it was determined that it will probably never succeed again.

In 1957, out of 64,800 people recorded as being in employment in the Borinage, 23,000 worked in the coal industry. Only 7,000 people in services, although in Belgium as a whole, 49 percent of employment was in the tertiary sector.

In the 1960s, because of the end of the collieries, Ladrière, Meynaud and Perin wrote that the Borinage died in the ideological and economical sense.

== Belgian general strikes ==
In his mid-twenties, Dutch painter Vincent van Gogh spent several years (c. 1878 – c. 1880) living in the Borinage. He initially preached to and lived among the coal miners, before suffering a breakdown and deciding to become an artist. His first masterpiece, The Potato Eaters (1885), depicting Dutch peasants, although not painted in the Borinage, was indirectly inspired by the bad conditions of the miners and their families in the Borinage.

Dutch-born Belgian painter Henry Luyten resided in the Borinage between 1886 and 1887. He witnessed the great strike and its bloody suppression. In response, he painted the triptych "The Strike", on which he worked until 1893. The painting (international title: "Struggle for Life") measures 3 to 5 meters. The painting on the right-hand panel (3 by 2 ½ meters) is called "After the uprising" and the left-hand panel is called "Misery".

This region was emblematic of the whole sillon industriel in Wallonia and of the Belgian general strikes, which often broke out in the Borinage. For instance the Belgian general strike of 1893 was initiated by the Borains according to Marcel Liebman.

== Misère au Borinage ==
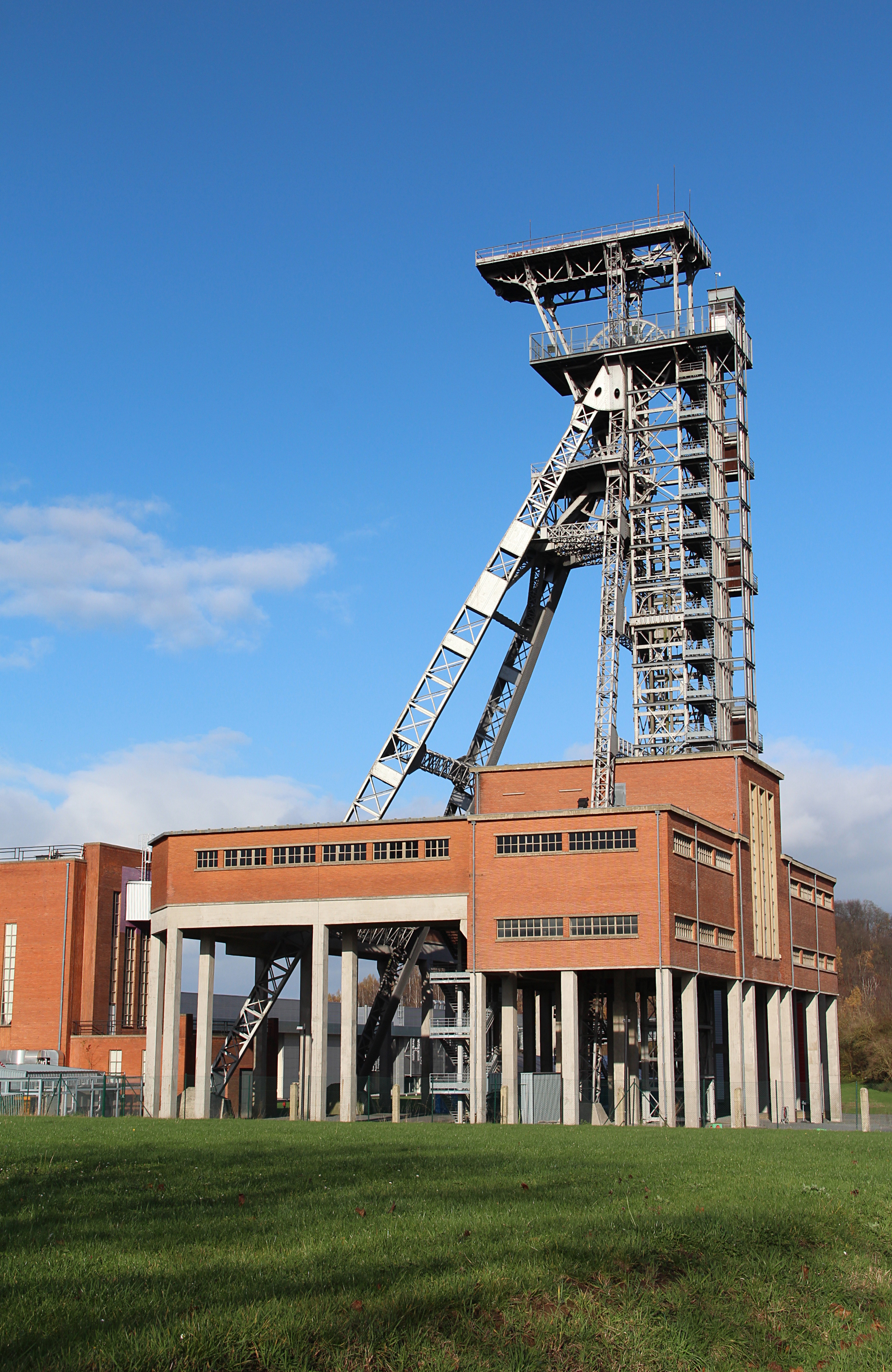
Gallow frame of the Crachet in Frameries (after renovation)

The area is best known for its former coalmining industry. The living conditions of the miners were featured in the famous documentary film Misère au Borinage (1933) made by Henri Storck and Joris Ivens.

It is one of the most important references in the documentary genre. In 1932, a great strike paralysed the coalmines of Wallonia and the response of employers and the police had been merciless. Throughout it all the broader population was ill-informed and largely indifferent. André Thirifays, Pierre Vermeylen and all the indignant young people involved in the Club de l'écran, decided to bear witness to this dire poverty using their weapon, the camera. With the aid of a doctor and a lawyer, with very little funding, hiding from the police but supported by the whole population, the shoot took place in difficult and exciting conditions. The film is hard, magnificent. It has lost nothing of its force, its strong emotional impact of indignation and compassion. It has left to the working class the strongest images of its history and struggles: evictions; thin-faced and absent-looking children packed together in slum houses; the procession with the portrait of Karl Marx; the collecting of low grade coal on the slagheaps at dawn; the begging miner etc. There is also the shock of images placed side by side: houses standing empty while homeless people sleep in the street, near-famine conditions with no aid, whereas big sums of money go to construct a church...

== Present-day Borinage ==
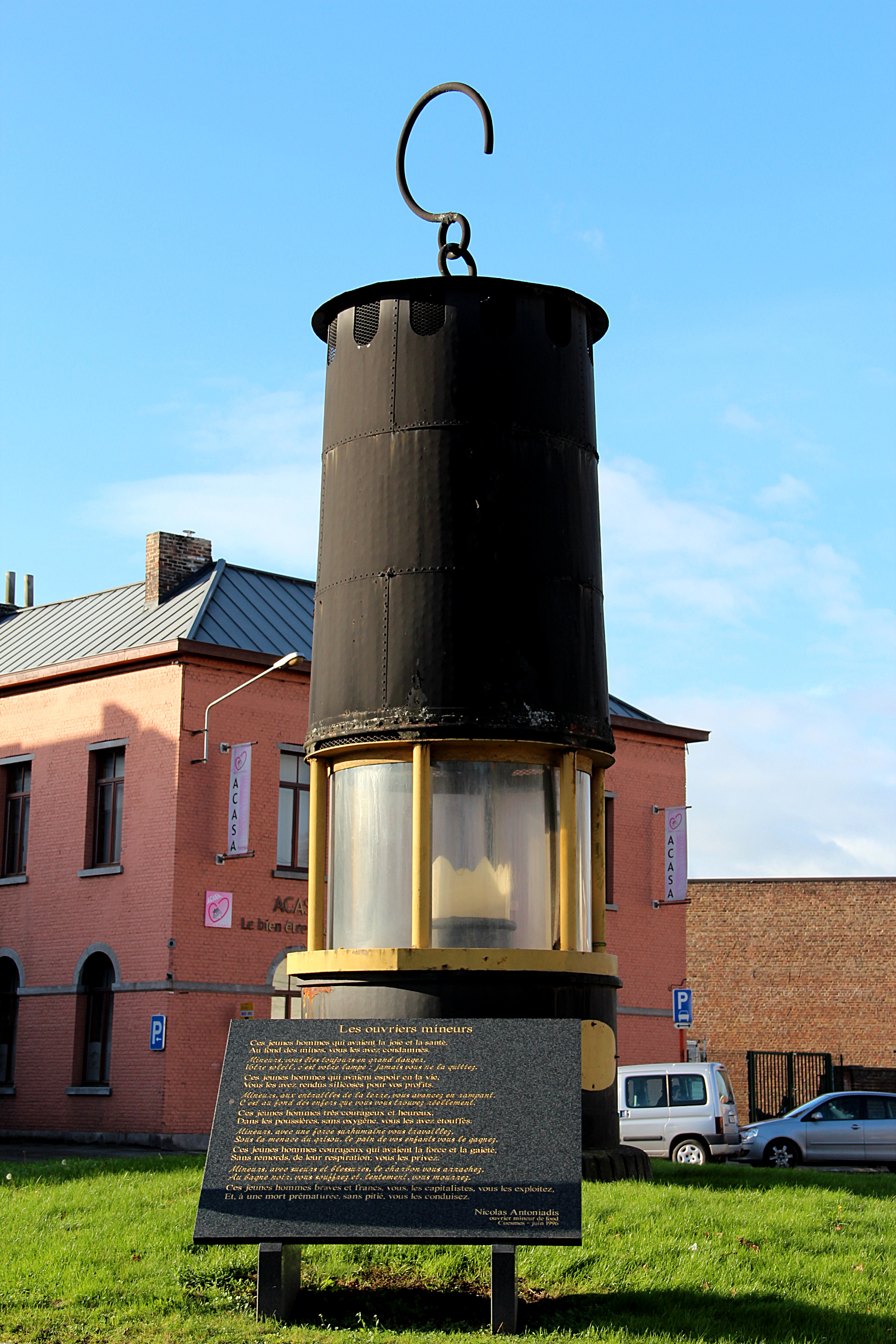
A giant statue of a mining lamp, in Cuesmes, commemorates the Héribus colliery.

Borinage is often considered the western end of the sillon industriel, the former industrial backbone of Wallonia, home to about two-thirds of Wallonia's population.

Since the last mines closed in the 1960s, the Borinage has had the highest unemployment rate of Belgium.

Google has its major European datacenter in Saint-Ghislain.

Four of the Major Mining Sites of Wallonia were listed as a UNESCO World Heritage Site in 2012. One of the sites, Grand-Hornu, is also home to the most important museum of contemporary art in Wallonia.

The former site of the Crachet-Picquery company's coal mine is now the SparkOH! "scientific adventure park."
