= General strikes in Belgium =

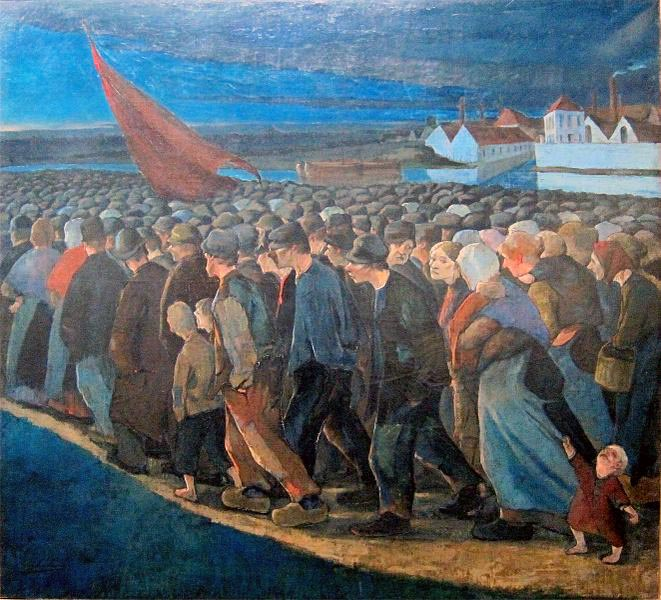
Depiction of striking Belgian workers in 1893 by the painter Eugène Laermans

Since 1893, there have been a number of general strikes in Belgium. Occasioned by the emergence of the labour movement and socialism in Belgium, general strikes have been an enduring part of Belgian political life. Originally intended to encourage the reform of the franchise, more recent strikes have focused on issues of wages and opposition to government austerity. Since 1945, general strikes have been co-ordinated by the General Federation of Belgian Labour (ABVV-FGTB), a federation of Socialist trade unions, while most before World War II were organised by the parliamentary Belgian Labour Party (POB-BWP).

According to Carl J. Strikwerda, the Belgian general strike of 1893 was the first general strike in the European history.

== Origins ==
In 1866, the Belgian government revoked the articles of the Le Chapelier Law which had outlawed trade unions. The first strikes followed soon after. A mining strike occurred in 1868 and textile workers went on strike during the economic depression of the 1870s. In 1885, the Belgian Labour Party, the country's first socialist parliamentary party, was formed. Despite the rapid growth of the labour movement, during the nineteenth century Belgian workers were known internationally for their low pay and poor working conditions.

The first major strike in Belgian history was the Belgian strike of 1886 which, though unorganised, led to the first legislation regarding working conditions.

== List ==
Year	Date	Title	Cause	Number of strikers	Description
1893	12–18 April	Belgian general strike of 1893	Franchise reform (in favour of universal suffrage)	200,000	Successfully led to the establishment of universal male suffrage with plural votes. Thirteen strikers were killed and socialist leaders were briefly arrested.
1902	10–20 April	Belgian general strike of 1902	Franchise reform (in favour of ending the plural vote)	350,000	Failed to achieve the abolition of the plural vote as Catholics and Liberals united to oppose constitutional reform. The Belgian Labour Party had been reluctant to support the strike and it soon descended into violence in Brussels and parts of Wallonia. 12 workers and one policeman were killed. Union membership dropped sharply in its aftermath.
1913	14–24 April	Belgian general strike of 1913	Franchise reform (in favour of ending the plural vote)	400,000	Carefully planned to avoid the same problems as 1902, the strike gained the promise of electoral reform but its proposals were postponed by the outbreak of World War I and the subsequent German occupation. The policy was finally adopted in 1919.
1932	7 July–9 September	Belgian general strike of 1932	Pay, working hours and unemployment insurance		Began after a spontaneous strike by coal miners in the Borinage and involved Communist agitation following a severe decrease in living standards and real wages during the Great Depression. Two people were killed during the strike.
1936	2 June-2 July	Belgian general strike of 1936	Working hours, paid holiday, union reforms	500,000	Broke out at the port of Antwerp and led to the creation of a National Labour Conference. Although influenced by the French Popular Front and held against the backdrop of the Spanish Civil War, it was also supported by Catholic trade unions.
1950	24 July-3 August	Belgian general strike of 1950	The Royal question (in favour of the abdication of King Leopold III)	700,000	Chiefly active in Wallonia, the strike contributed to the abdication of King Leopold III on 1 August 1950. At least four strikers were killed.
1960–61	20 December-23 January	Belgian general strike of 1960-61	Austerity	700,000	Strike over the winter of 1960-61 which failed to defeat the austerity programme introduced by the government of Gaston Eyskens known as the Unitary Law (Loi Unique/Eenheidswet). The strike's failure to attract sustained support among workers in Flanders combined with the ongoing industrial decline of Wallonia contributed to the growing language divide in Belgium by the late 1960s.
1982	February, November, December	Belgian national strikes of 1982	Austerity, union reform, devaluation of the Belgian franc		Three 24-hour strikes against the backdrop of the early 1980s recession
1983	9–12 September	Belgian national strike of 1983	Cuts to public services		A general strike of public sector workers against the backdrop of the early 1980s recession.
1993	26 November	Belgian general strike of 1993	Wage indexing reform		An unsuccessful strike against the Global Plan (plan global) of Jean-Luc Dehaene's government amid the early 1990s recession and the 1992 approval of the Maastricht Treaty.
2005	7 and 28 October	Belgian general strikes of 2005	Raising the retirement age		Unsuccessful strike against the plans of Guy Verhofstadt's government to raise the retirement age from 58 to 60.
2012	30 January	Belgian general strike of 2012	Austerity		
2014	15 December	2014 Belgian anti-austerity movement	Austerity	120,000+	Unsuccessful opposition to the austerity of the Charles Michel government in the context of the Great Recession and European debt crisis.
2025	31 March	Belgian general strike of 2025	Pension reform		
2025	24-26 November	2025 Belgian general strike	Austerity		

== See also ==
- Strike of the 100,000 - a notable strike in German-occupied Belgium in 1941
- Misère au Borinage (1933) - Socialist film looking at the living conditions in the Borinage after the 1932 strike
- Belgium in the long nineteenth century

== Bibliography ==
- Cook, Bernard A. (2004). Belgium: A History. Studies in Modern European History (3rd ed.). New York: Peter Lang. ISBN 0-8204-7647-1.
- Witte, Els; Craeybeckx, Jan; Meynen, Alain (2009). Political History of Belgium from 1830 Onwards (New ed.). Brussels: ASP. ISBN 978-90-5487-517-8.
- Strikwerda, Carl (1997). A House Divided: Catholics, Socialists, and Flemish Nationalists in Nineteenth-century Belgium. Lanham, Md.: Rowman & Littlefield. ISBN 978-0847685271.
- Coenen, Marie-Thérèse (2004). L'État de la Belgique: 1989 - 2004, quinze années a la charnière du siècle (1st ed.). Brussels: De Boeck Univ. ISBN 9782804146382.
