= Belgian general strike of 1902 =

General strike in Belgium

General strike
- 1902; Part of general strikes in Belgium
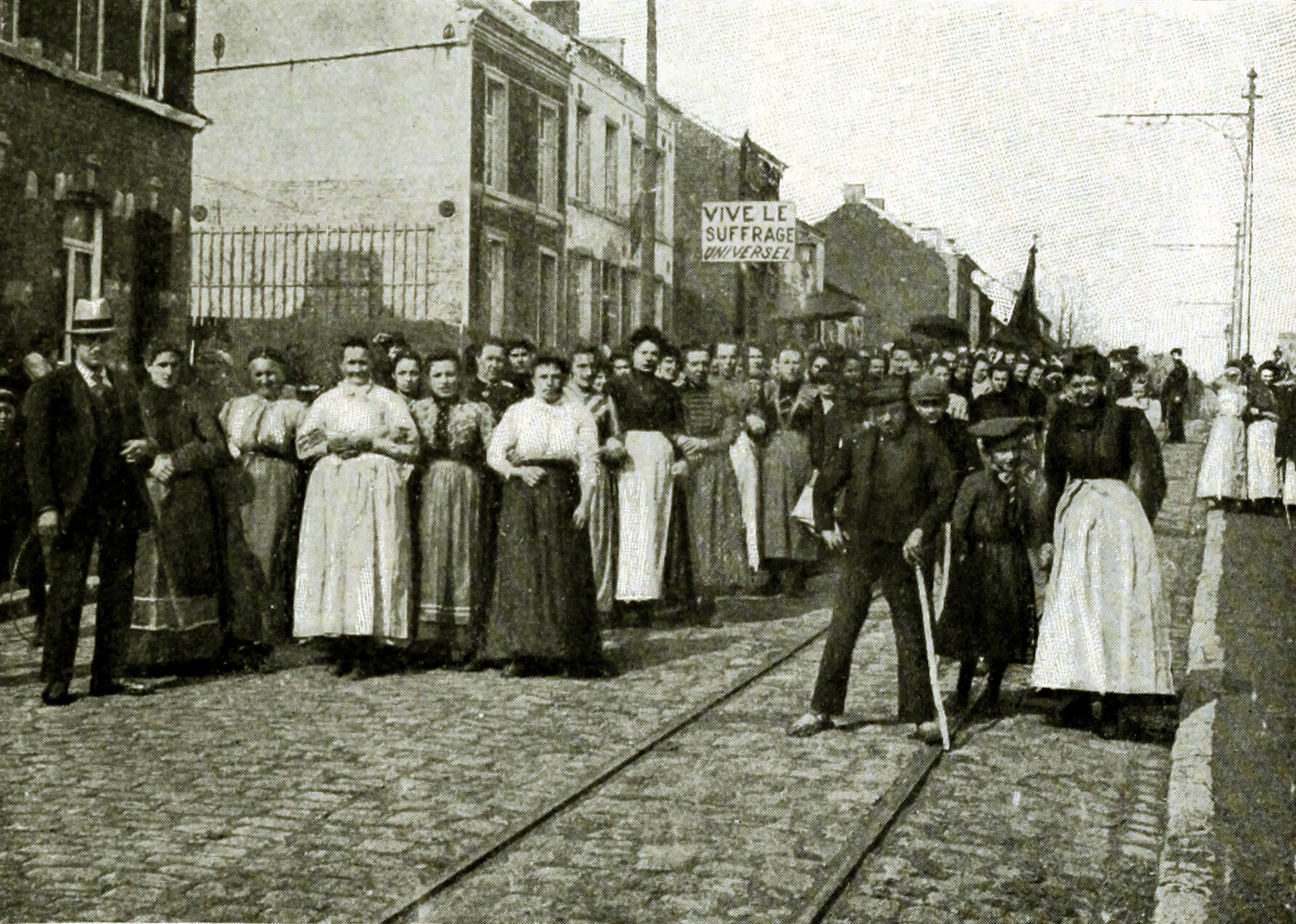
- An illustration from Scribner's Magazine of female strikers demonstrating in favour of universal suffrage in La Louvière
- Date: 10-20 April
- Location: Belgium
- Goals: Electoral reform
- Methods: Strike action

Parties
POB-BWP; Trade unions Miners; Anarchists	Belgian government Gendarmerie

Lead figures
Emile Vandervelde	Leopold II

Casualties and losses
12	1

The general strike of 1902 (French: grève générale de 1902, Dutch: algemene staking van 1902) was a major general strike in Belgium, aimed at forcing electoral reform and notably the end of the system of plural voting. It officially lasted between 10 and 20 April. The 1902 strike was the second general strike in Belgium's history and although the largest, it was ultimately unsuccessful at achieving its objectives.

== History ==
The 1902 strike followed the general strike of 1893 which had led to the creation of universal male suffrage moderated by plural voting. The resulting system gave disproportional political power to the wealthy. Nevertheless, Emile Vandervelde and the leadership of the Belgian Workers' Party (POB-BWP), as well as the trade unions, were reluctant to take further action. The general strike of 1902 was therefore forced by coal miners in Wallonia who were angry at their poor living conditions. It was also supported by anarchists who believed that a general strike could become a full-fledged revolution.

Wildcat strikes broke out among miners in the Province of Liège on 8 April 1902. Fearing that the party were losing control, the POB-BWP declared an official general strike on 10 April. From the start, the strike was particularly violent. In one incident, six strikers were killed by police in Leuven. In total, 12 workers and one policeman were killed. However, parliament refused to reopen the subject of voting reform. On 20 April, the POB-BWP declared the strike ended and most of the strikers returned to work the following morning.

The issue of electoral reform remained unresolved and led to another general strike in 1913 which achieved the promise of reform to the plural voting system. This was halted by the outbreak of World War I and subsequent German occupation. Plural voting was finally abolished in 1919 and universal suffrage, giving the vote to all Belgian women, was only introduced in 1948.

== International influence ==
The failure of the 1902 strike, followed by the failure of the 1905 Revolution in Russia, encouraged some socialists across Europe to reject the revolutionary ideology of Mikhail Bakunin.

The German socialist Rosa Luxemburg followed the progress of the 1902 strike in detail and published her observations in The Mass Strike (1906). The events changed Luxemburg's opinion about the relationship between legality and the general strike, as well as on the revolutionary potential of unorganised strike actions.

== See also ==
- General strikes in Belgium
- Belgium in the long nineteenth century
