= Belgium in the long nineteenth century =

History of Belgium from 1789 to 1914

In the history of Belgium, the period from 1789 to 1914, dubbed the "long 19th century" by the historian Eric Hobsbawm, includes the end of Austrian rule and periods of French and Dutch rule over the region, leading to the creation of the first independent Belgian state in 1830.

In the years leading up to 1789, the territory today known as Belgium was divided into two states, called the Austrian Netherlands and Prince-Bishopric of Liège, both of which were part of the Holy Roman Empire. The area was captured by the French during the French Revolutionary Wars and incorporated into the French First Republic from roughly 1794 to 1815. In the aftermath of Napoleon's final defeat in 1815, the Congress of Vienna added the territory of Belgium to the United Kingdom of the Netherlands.

In 1830, with the Belgian Revolution, the Belgian provinces declared their independence, which was recognized by the great powers in 1839. From 1885 the creation of a personal colony by King Leopold II, the Congo Free State caused an international outcry over human rights abuses, and forced the Belgian state to annex the colony in 1908, which became the Belgian Congo. In 1909, after his uncle's death, Albert I began his reign, which lasted until 1934. Despite having declared neutrality, Belgium was invaded by the German Empire in August 1914, beginning the country's involvement in World War I.

The "long 19th century" saw profound cultural and economic changes in Belgium. The Industrial Revolution, which began to take effect in Belgium during the period of French rule, transformed the country's economy over the course of the period. By 1914, Belgium was acknowledged as one of the most densely industrialized countries in Europe, with notable coal mining and manufacturing industries.

At the start of the period, French was the dominant language, and was the only one approved for use in legal and government business; however Belgium became officially bilingual in 1870 and Dutch was officially recognized as an equal language to French in legal matters in 1898.

== General aspects ==
=== Geography and demographics ===
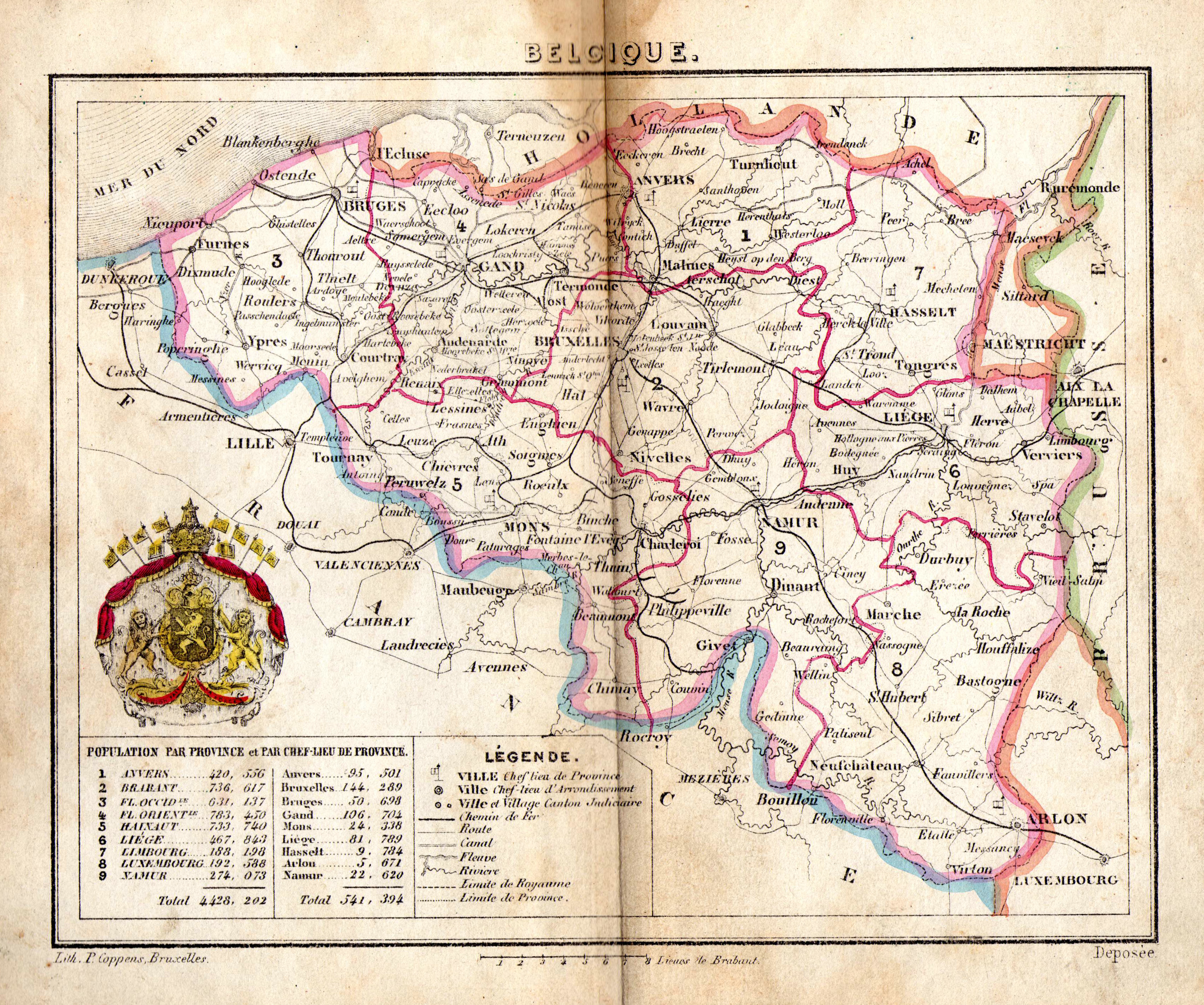
Map of Belgium in the 1850s

The territory of Belgium varied little over the period. Belgium's border with the Netherlands was almost the same as that which had been created after the Dutch Revolt in the early 17th century, and its western border was almost the same as those of the 18th-century polities the Austrian Netherlands and Prince-Bishopric of Liège. It was only after the French annexation of 1795 that the territory became a single entity. In the 1830s, Belgian revolutionaries sought to create an independent state within the borders of the nine provinces that had been established under French occupation while ending the traditional roles of the small duchies, princedoms and counties which had traditionally been the basic territorial units. Aside from Zeelandic Flanders, part of Luxembourg, and Eastern Limburg, which were ceded to the Dutch to compensate for the loss of the rest of the territory, the outline of Belgium in 1914 was virtually identical to that established by the French in 1795. The three ceded territories had a total of 300,000 inhabitants at the time.

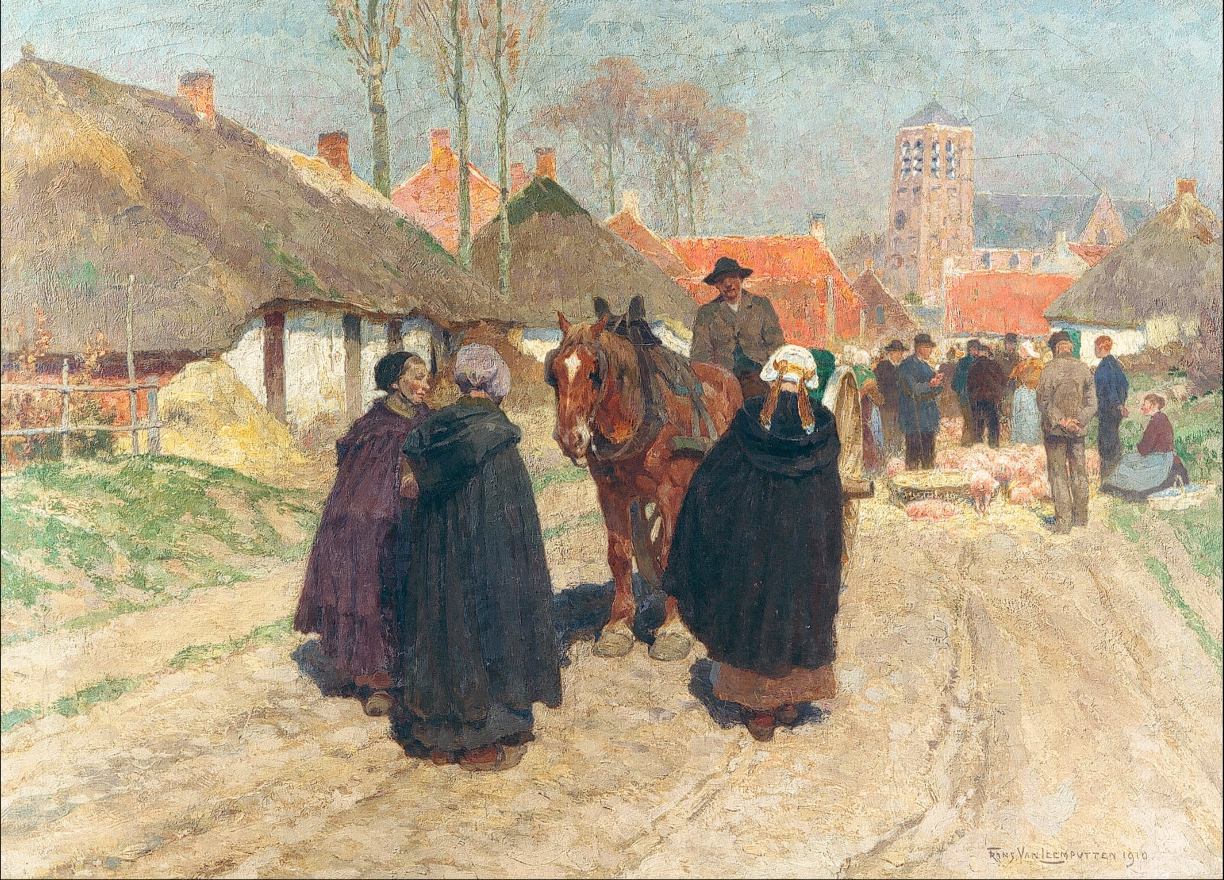
Market day in the Campine (1910) by Frans Van Leemputten depicts rural life in the Belgian Kempen region

The northern half of Belgium, which would come to be known as Flanders, was a largely agricultural area containing the important port of Antwerp, the city of Ghent and the capital, Brussels. In the southern half, which would come to be known as Wallonia, a number of smaller towns and cities along the valley of the Sambre and Meuse rivers – the sillon industriel ("industrial valley") – became the focus of industrialization. In the west of the valley, around Charleroi, was the Pays Noir ("Black Country"), which held significant coal deposits. In southeast Belgium, along the border with Luxembourg and Prussia (later Germany), was the heavily forested and agricultural region known as the Ardennes.

In 1784, the population of Belgium was about 2.65 million. Around a quarter of the population in the Austrian Netherlands resided in cities, reflecting a level of urbanization that was exceptional in eighteenth-century Europe. During the 19th century, the population both expanded and urbanized. Between 1830 and 1875 the population of Brussels grew from 100,000 to 180,000, and by 1910 the population of the metropolitan area soared to 750,000. The population of Belgium was almost universally Roman Catholic, though free-thinking movements like Freemasonry were also popular among intellectuals and the urban middle classes.

Throughout the "long 19th century," as a common destination for political refugees, Belgium was home to important émigré communities, particularly in Brussels. From 1871, many of the Paris Communards fled to Brussels, where they received political asylum. The far-right politician General Georges Boulanger arrived in 1889. Other notable exiles living in Belgium included the writer Victor Hugo and the theorist Karl Marx.

=== Language ===
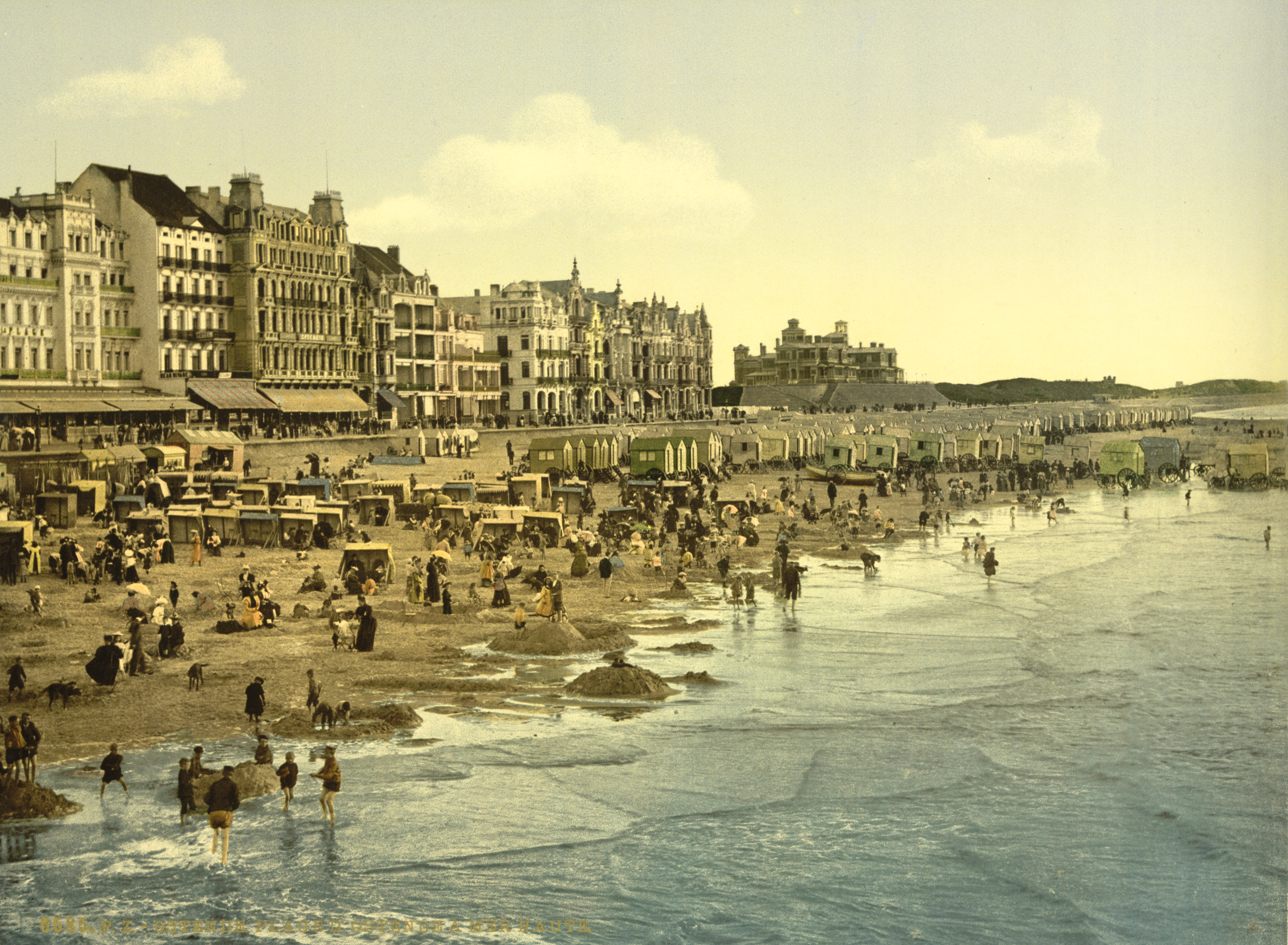
Belgian holidaymakers at Ostend in Flanders, c.1895

While in control of Belgium, France and the Netherlands each tried to take some measures to encourage assimilation of their national languages, but in neither case did their rule last long enough for either language to become fully entrenched across the region or for local dialects to be displaced.

In 1784, 65 percent of the population spoke Dutch. In 1846, 57 percent of Belgians spoke dialects of Dutch or Flemish as their primary language while 42 percent spoke dialects of French, such as Walloon, Picard or Gaumais. Under one percent of the population spoke German. Across the country, the aristocracy and middle classes spoke French, often as a second language, and French was the language of the legal system and government. There was a huge variation in accents, spelling and grammar across the country, particularly in Flanders, where regional dialects were almost incomprehensible to those from other regions.

In Brussels, Dutch speakers made up about 90 percent of the population in 1784. In 1842, 38 percent spoke French while the share of Dutch speakers was 61 percent; many residents spoke dialects such as Marols instead of the standard languages. By the end of the period, social change and internal immigration from Wallonia contributed to the growing importance of French in Brussels.

== Periods ==
=== Austrian rule and the Prince-Bishopric of Liège ===
Map of the region of modern-day Belgium at the start of the period. The Austrian Netherlands was not contiguous and was bisected by the independent Prince-Bishopric of Liège.

In 1789, the area of modern-day Belgium was divided into two independently-governed polities, both part of the Holy Roman Empire. The Austrian Netherlands, which included most of the territory of modern-day Belgium, had been in existence since the end of the War of the Spanish Succession in 1714 when the Habsburg monarchy annexed the section called the Spanish Netherlands from the Spanish branch of the house. The traditional principalities, duchies and counties surviving from the Middle Ages retained great regional autonomy. The economy of the Austrian Netherlands developed little, as its neighboring states imposed high export tariffs and the port of Antwerp remained blocked by the Dutch. Although Enlightenment ideals developed among the urban bourgeoisie, most of the population remained suspicious of education and extremely politically conservative. The Catholic church was particularly influential, despite the attempts of Emperor Joseph II to reduce its power.

The Prince-Bishopric of Liège was a small ecclesiastical state that had been in existence since the 10th century. It was ruled by a line of prince-bishops. By the 1780s the state's capital, Liège, was the largest city in Belgium. The prince-bishopric was not a single continuous country, but rather consisted of several islands of territory surrounded by the Austrian Netherlands. One of the foremost industrial regions of the time, the prince-bishopric was known for its successful wool, armaments and coal-mining industries, and traded widely. The state was notionally governed by agreement of the Three Estates (the clergy, the nobility, and commoners), but from 1684, officials were elected by 16 separate chambers, each composed of wealthy nobles and guild members elected for life. Many groups were unrepresented, including the bourgeoisie, industrialists and lower clergy. The spread of the Enlightenment, which became popular in Liège in the 18th century, bred further discontent with the political system.

==== Revolutions of 1789 ====
On 18 August 1789, just months after the start of the French Revolution, a revolution broke out in the Prince-Bishopric of Liège. In a meeting at the town hall, the democrat Jean-Nicolas Bassenge called for the reinstatement of two popular mayors who had been dismissed by the prince-bishop. The revolutionaries forced their way into the city's citadel and forced Prince-Bishop Constantin-François de Hoensbroeck to ratify the appointments. The prince-bishop acquiesced but fled the principality for Trier a few days later. With the prince-bishop gone, the revolutionaries declared Liège a republic. Just twenty days after the Declaration of the Rights of Man and of the Citizen had been approved in France, a nearly identical document was introduced in Liège declaring all citizens equal before the law and proclaiming freedom of thought and expression. Despite the revolutionaries pleading their case, the Diet of the Holy Roman Empire condemned the revolution and ordered the restoration of the old regime. The army of Liège was finally defeated by the Austrians, who re-occupied the city in January 1791. The Prince-Bishop was reinstated.

In the Austrian Netherlands, a populist revolt called the Brabant Revolution broke out in 1789 as a result of the perceived injustices of the Austrian regime. Emperor Joseph II's liberal reforms particularly angered Catholics, who feared a further decline in church influence, while for some his policies had not been sufficiently radical or liberal. Fighting began in October 1789 as an émigré patriot army in the neighboring Dutch Republic invaded the country and defeated the Austrians at Turnhout. The émigré army succeeded in pushing the Austrian forces out of all the territory except Luxembourg. A loose confederation of states in the region was formed as the United Belgian States. The use of the word "Belgium" in 1789 was the first time that the term had been officially employed to denote the region since Roman times. The revolution was conservative in character, not seeking to create a radically different social or religious order. Once established, the revolutionaries divided into political factions. The liberal Vonckists, led by Jan Frans Vonck, were eventually denounced and forced into exile by their conservative rivals, the Statists, led by Henri Van der Noot. The Brabant revolutionaries were finally defeated by Holy Roman forces, who occupied Brussels in December 1790.

Following the crushing of the two revolutions, a number of Brabant and Liège revolutionaries regrouped in Paris, where they formed the joint Committee of United Belgians and Liégeois (Comité des belges et liégeois unis), which united revolutionaries from both territories for the first time. Three Belgian corps and a Liège Legion were levied to continue the fight for the French against the Austrians.

=== French rule ===
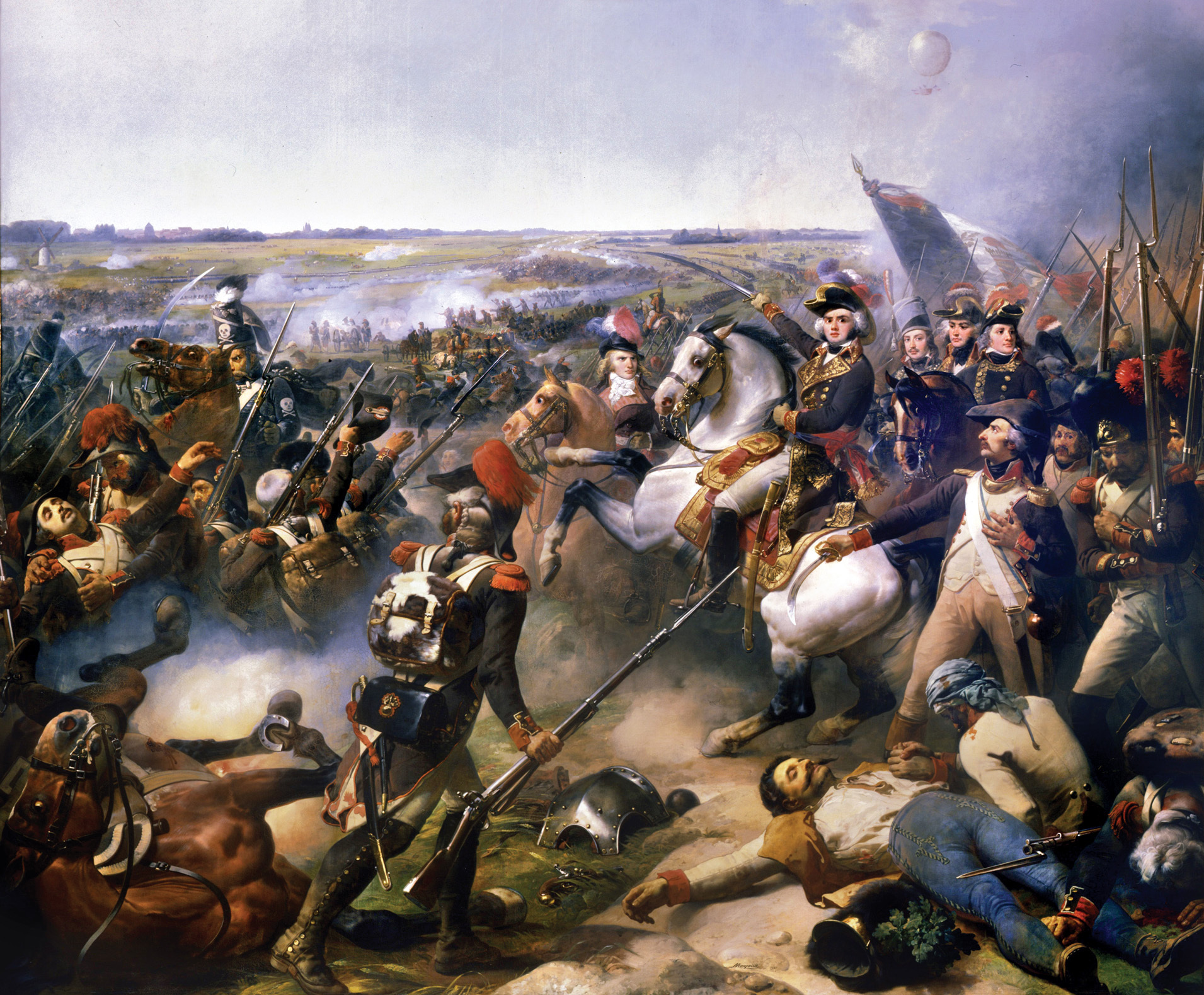
The Battle of Fleurus, which pushed the Austrians out of the territory for the last time

In the aftermath of the execution of King Louis XVI, revolutionary France was attacked by Prussian and Holy Roman forces from the Austrian Netherlands. Though the French defeated the Austrian army in the Battle of Jemappes in 1792 and briefly occupied the Austrian Netherlands and Prince-Bishopric of Liège, they were pushed out by an Austrian counterattack in the Battle of Neerwinden the following year. In June 1794, French revolutionary troops expelled Holy Roman forces from the region for the last time after the Battle of Fleurus. The French government voted to formally annex the territory in October 1795 and it was split into nine provincial départements within France.

French rule in the region was marked by the rapid implementation and extension of numerous reforms which had been passed in post-Revolution France since 1789. Administration was organized under the French model, with meritocratic selection. Legal equality and state secularism were also introduced.

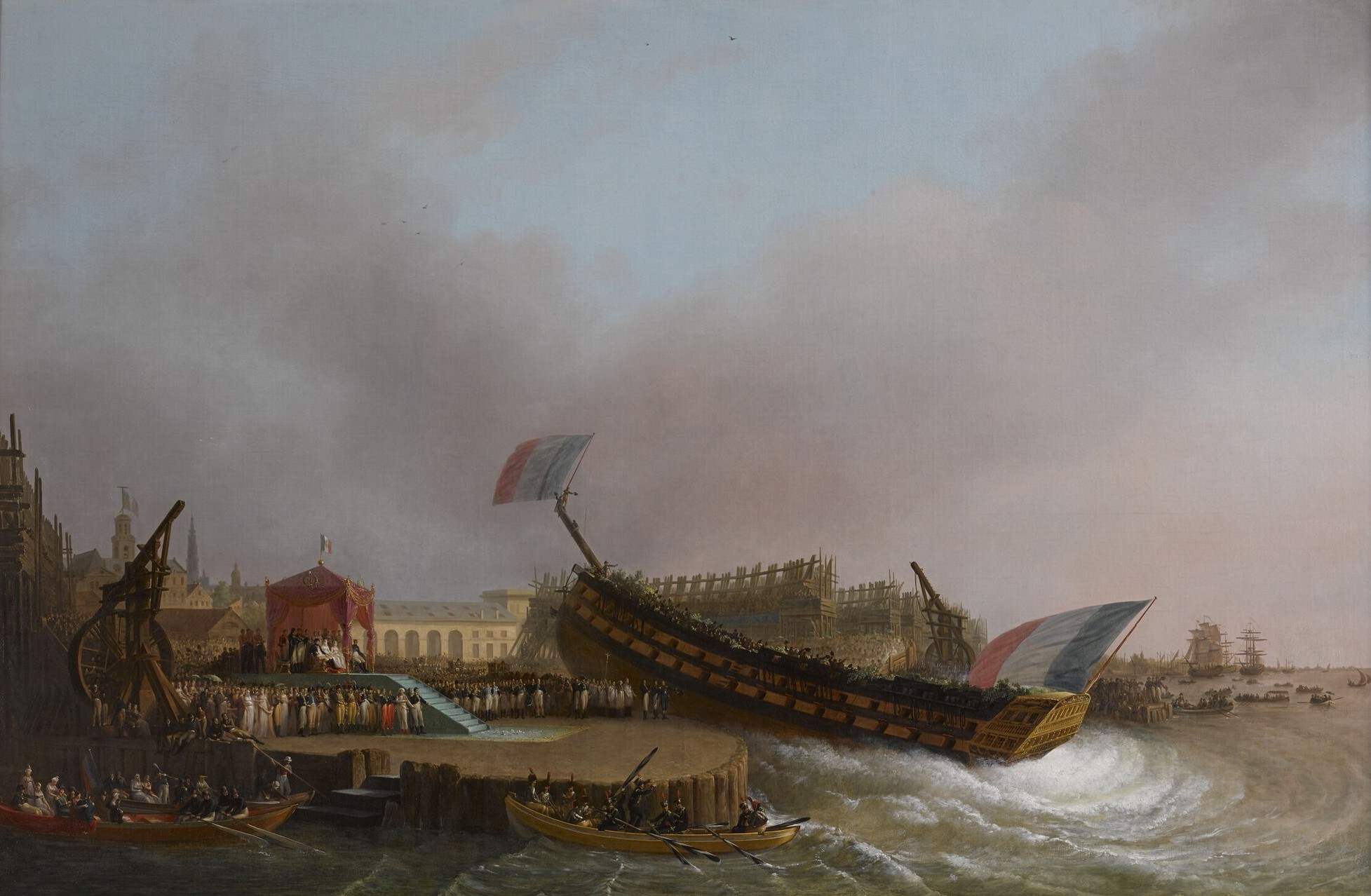
Napoleon attending the launch of the warship Friedland in Antwerp in 1810

The important University of Louvain was dissolved and re-founded without its religious status. In Liège, Jacobin-inspired locals pulled down the medieval St. Lambert's Cathedral. Use of the French language was actively encouraged and publications in Dutch banned as the government tried to integrate the territory into France, leaving a lasting legacy. Contingents of Belgian revolutionaries had served in the French army since 1792, but after the occupation, compulsory military conscription was extended to Belgians, 160,000 of whom were forced into the French army by 1813. The policy was extremely unpopular, and an insurrection known as the Peasants' War broke out in East Flanders and the Ardennes in 1798 in response. The revolt, which spread rapidly, was quickly and violently suppressed by the French. Under Napoleon, the Code Napoleon, which would form the basis of all future Belgian legal codes, was implemented.

The period of French rule coincided with the start of the Industrial Revolution in Belgium. Use of mechanical production techniques was encouraged by the French state. The government particularly encouraged industrialization of Belgian industries of military use, such as the cannon foundries at Liège.

As the course of the Napoleonic Wars turned, the territory was invaded by Russian and Prussian forces. After Napoleon's defeat and exile in 1814, the Southern Netherlands were occupied jointly by the Austrians, Prussians and Dutch. In an attempt to strengthen their position in Belgium, the Austrians began to recruit a Belgian Legion of infantry, cavalry and artillery, which was merged with the Dutch army. The Hundred Days' Campaign, launched by Napoleon after his escape from exile, was largely fought in Belgium in early 1815, and Napoleon's final defeat at the Battle of Waterloo occurred just miles from Brussels.

=== Dutch rule ===
After Napoleon's total defeat in 1815, the Congress of Vienna merged the French territory in Belgium with the Netherlands to form the United Kingdom of the Netherlands as a buffer state against the French. It was ruled by William I of Orange. The synergy of combining the manufacturing centers in Belgium with the important exporting ports in the Netherlands encouraged growth of the industrial cloth manufacturing and metallurgic centers in Wallonia. Keen to promote the economic development of the southern provinces as well, William I founded the Société Générale des Pays-Bas in 1822 to provide businesses with capital to invest in machinery. (Note: In full, the Société Générale des Pays-Bas pour favoriser l'Industrie nationale ("General Company of the Netherlands for promoting National Industry"). After independence, it would become the Société Générale de Belgique (SGB).) The Société Générale served as a driving force behind Belgian industrialization in the 19th century, and at its height controlled large swathes of the national economy. William I also encouraged the creation of educational facilities in the Southern Provinces, founding the State University of Leuven, the University of Liège and Ghent University in 1817.

The period of Dutch rule saw growing hostility between the Catholic Belgian provinces and the predominantly Protestant Dutch. The Belgian provinces also complained that they were underrepresented by the Kingdom's system of government, where 55 Belgian deputies were allocated to represent 3.5 million people, while an equal number of Dutch deputies represented just two million. When the States-General voted against adopting the new unrepresentative constitution, William declared that the minority favorable vote outweighed the negative vote. Liberals in Belgium also accused William of attacking personal and religious freedoms.

=== Belgian Revolution ===
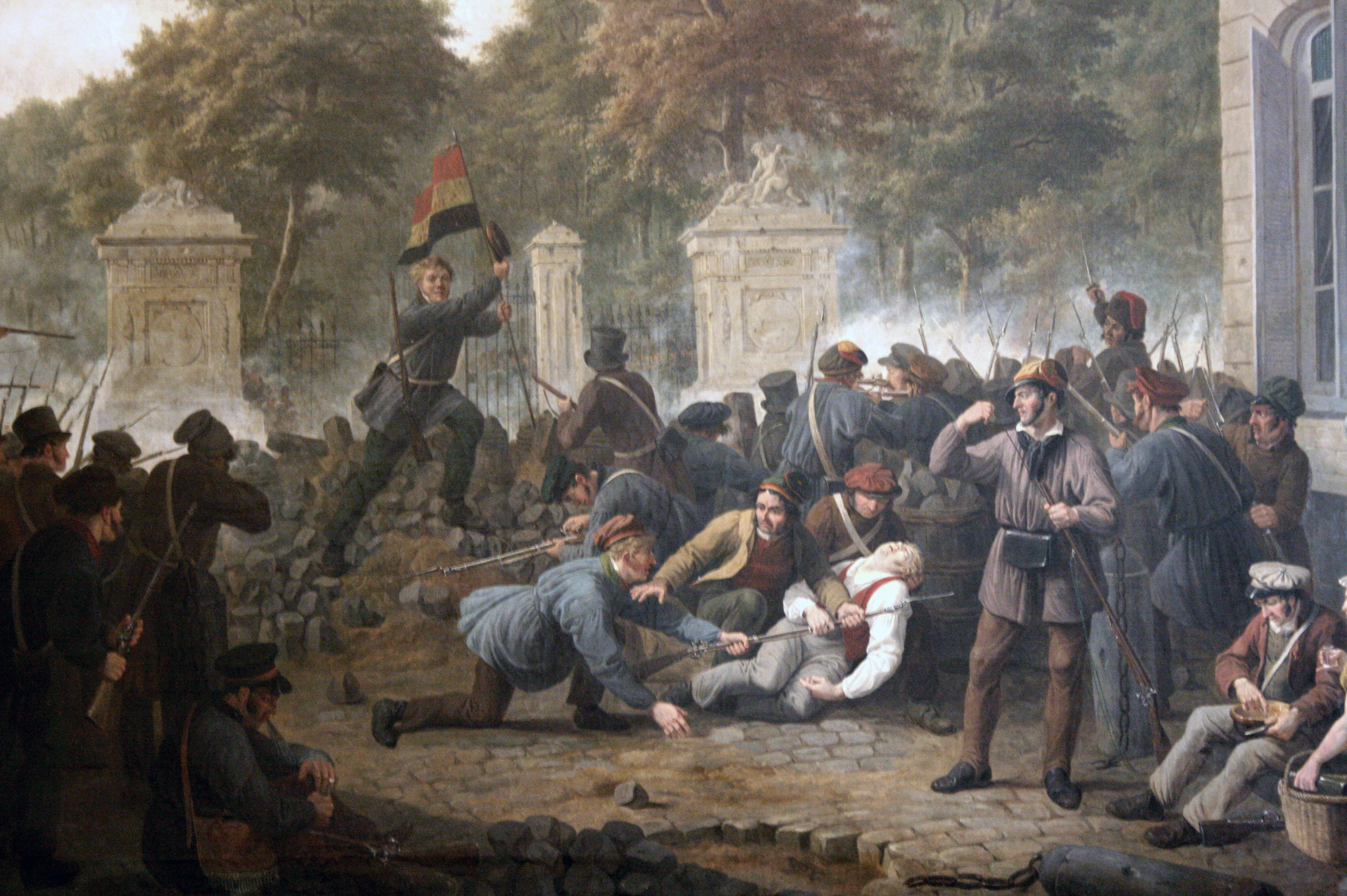
Belgian revolutionaries fighting at the barricades around Brussels Park in 1830

The Belgian Revolution broke out on 25 August 1830, after the performance of a nationalist opera (La muette de Portici) in Brussels led to a minor insurrection among the capital's bourgeoisie, who sang patriotic songs and captured some public buildings in the city. This early revolutionary group was swelled by a large number of urban workers. The following day, the revolutionaries began flying their own flag, clearly influenced by that of the Brabant Revolution of 1789. To maintain order, several bourgeois militia groups were formed. The situation in Brussels led to widespread unrest across the country. William I rejected his son's advice to negotiate with the rebels, forcing them towards a more radical, pro-independence stance, and sent a large military force to Brussels suppress the insurrection.

Between 23 and 27 September 1830, heavy fighting took place between Dutch forces and Brussels revolutionaries, who were reinforced by small contingents from across the country. The Dutch were eventually forced to retreat. In the aftermath of the failed attack and concurrent mass desertions of Belgian soldiers from the Dutch army, the revolution spread around Belgium. Dutch garrisons were pushed out of the area, until only Antwerp and Luxembourg remained occupied. The Provisional Government of Belgium, led by Charles Rogier, was formed on 24 September and Belgian independence was officially proclaimed on 4 October while work began on creating a constitution. In December, international governments at the Conference of London recognized the independence of Belgium and guaranteed its neutrality. The Dutch, however, only recognized Belgium's independence and the terms of the Conference in 1839 and the Dutch-Belgian frontier was only fixed by the 1843 Treaty of Maastricht.

==== Creation of the Belgian Constitution ====
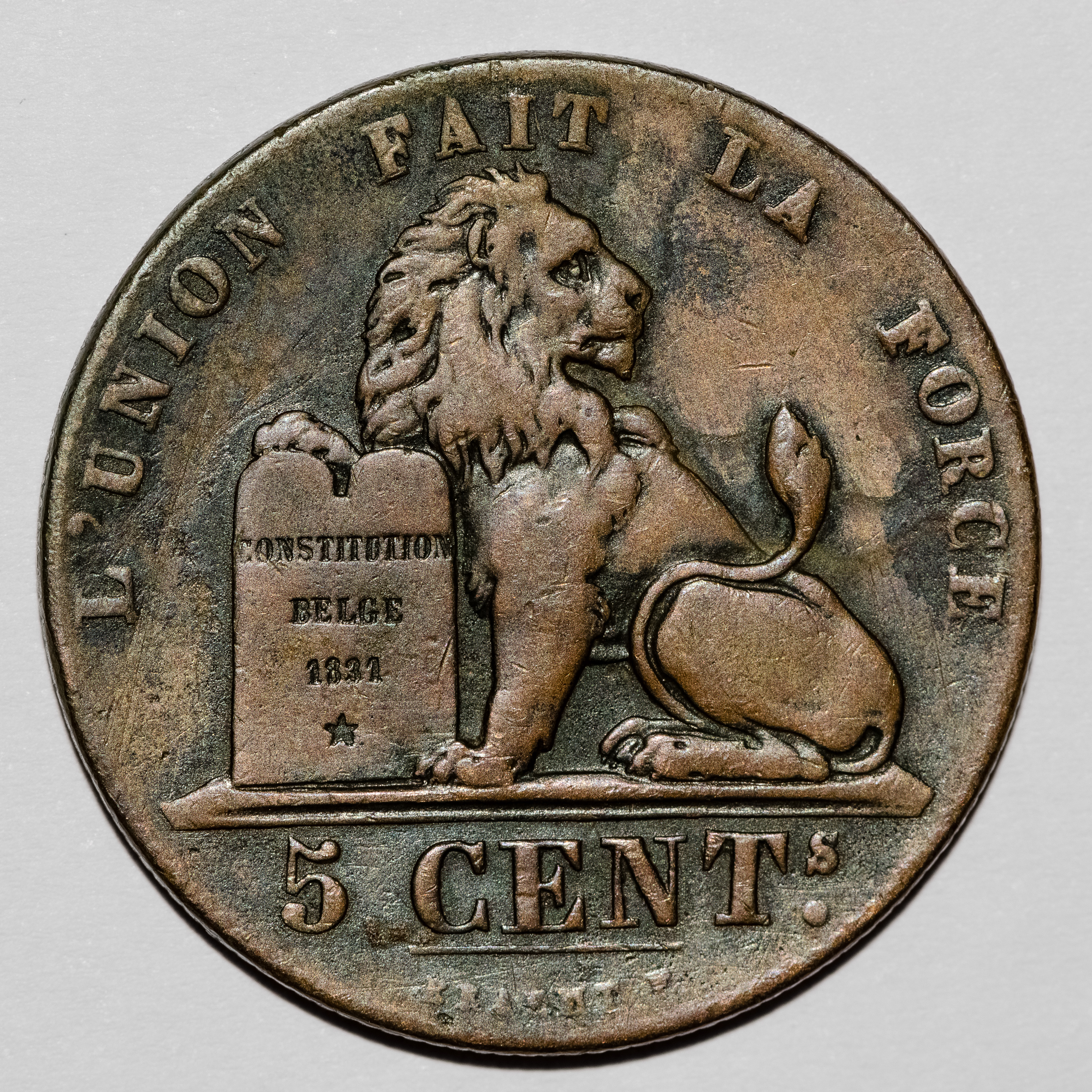
The Belgian Constitution depicted with the Leo Belgicus on a coin

In November 1830, a National Congress was established to create a Belgian constitution. Fears of mob rule associated with republicanism after the French Revolution of 1789, as well as the example of the recent July Revolution in France, led the Congress to decide that Belgium would be a popular, constitutional monarchy. The Congress approached several candidates, but chose Leopold of Saxe-Coburg-Gotha, a minor but well-connected German noble, to be the first King of the Belgians. He was officially inaugurated on 21 July 1831, after taking an oath to abide by the Constitution. This king, Leopold I, was generally unsatisfied with the amount of power allocated to the monarch, and sought to extend it wherever the Constitution was ambiguous or unclear while generally avoiding involvement in routine politics.

The Constitution developed by the National Congress was implemented in July 1831. It guaranteed individual liberty, property rights, freedom of religion and the press, and equality before the law. Because of its perceived balance between freedom and rule of law, it was praised by liberals around the world and promoted as a model for future constitutions. Under the new constitution, Belgium had two chambers, a Chamber of Representatives and Senate, both elected by a small number of wealthy citizens. The King was allowed substantial power in military affairs, but was given little independent power in any other sphere, which was instead given to the elected chambers.

=== Reign of Leopold I ===
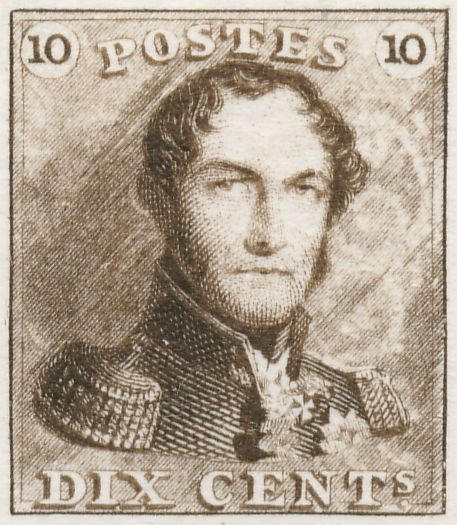
Leopold I, depicted on the first Belgian postage stamp, issued in 1849

Leopold I was crowned on 21 July 1831, replacing Baron Surlet de Chokier, who had served as regent since February. Before his selection by the National Congress, Leopold had been Duke of the minor German state of Saxe-Coburg and Gotha. He had pursued a distinguished military career fighting for the Russian Empire during the Napoleonic Wars and was well connected to other European monarchies. (Note: Leopold was briefly married to Charlotte, daughter of the British King George IV, making him second in line to the British throne until her death in 1817. His second wife, Louise of Orleans, was the daughter of Louis Philippe I of France. He was the uncle of Queen Victoria of Great Britain. In February 1830 he had been offered the crown of Greece, but decided to refuse.)

Despite the Congress of London's verdict in 1830, the Dutch continued to resist Belgian independence for much of Leopold I's early reign. On 2 August 1831, days after Leopold's coronation, the Dutch launched an invasion known as the Ten Days' Campaign. The 50,000-strong Dutch force crossed the border and rapidly pushed the small Belgian army back as far as Leuven. Faced with a military disaster, the Belgian government appealed to the French for support. Without international support of their own and faced with an entire French army under General Étienne Gérard, the Dutch withdrew on 12 August. In 1832 the French pushed the Dutch out of Antwerp, their final garrison in Belgium. Much of the city was destroyed in the fighting. Sporadic skirmishes along the border continued until 1839, when the Dutch signed the Treaty of London. The Ten Days' Campaign revealed the fragility of the Belgian position, and although the Dutch finally recognized the independence of Belgium, the Belgians were forced to give up some disputed territories, including Zeelandic Flanders and the Duchy of Limburg. Part of Luxembourg, equivalent to the modern state, remained as a semi-independent protectorate of the Dutch until 1890.

==== Politics and the Crisis of the 1840s ====
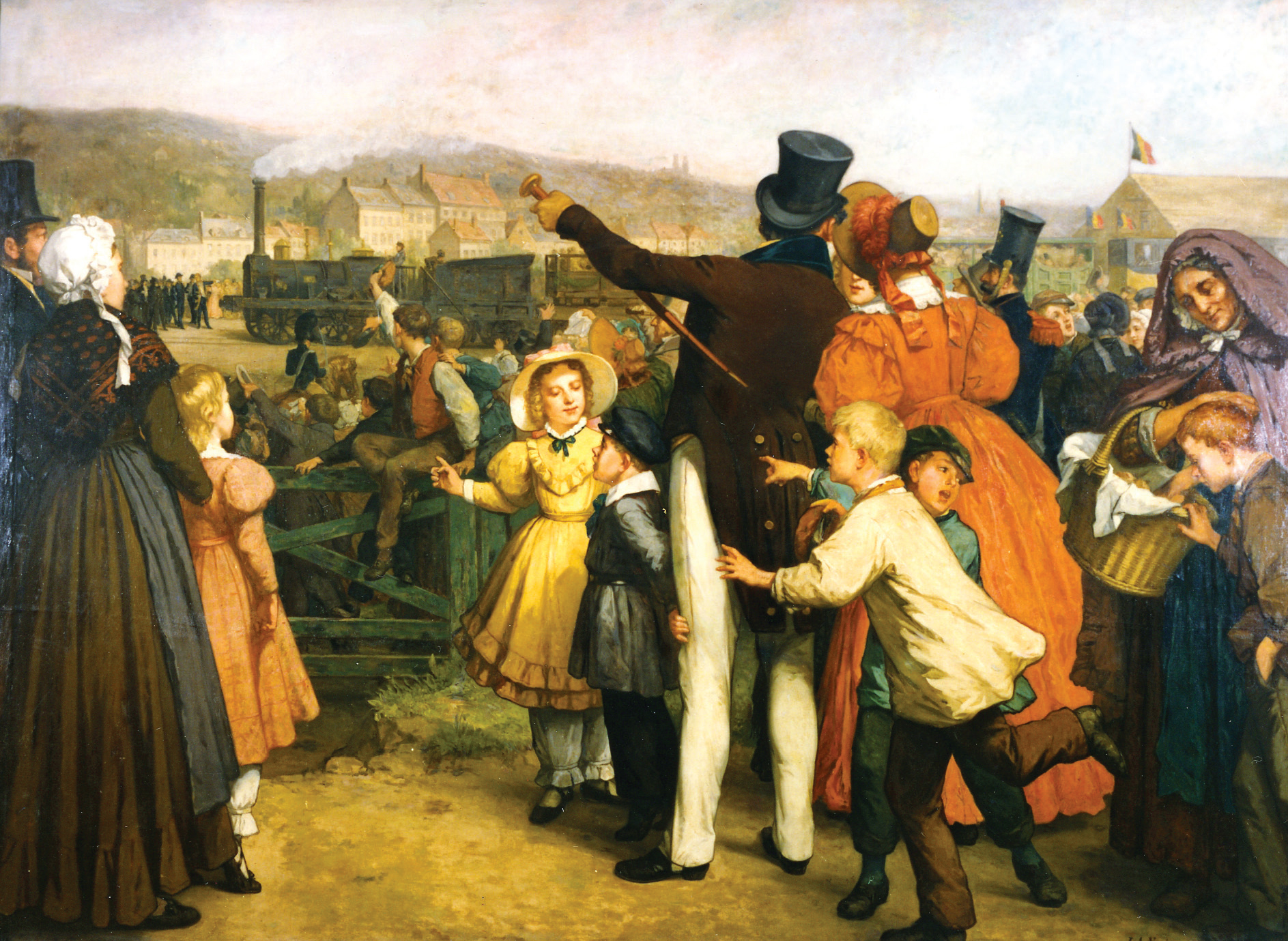
Opening of the first railway in Belgium, 5 May 1835

Politics in Belgium under Leopold I were polarized between liberal and Catholic political factions, though before 1847 they collaborated in unionist governments. The liberals were opposed to the church and particularly opposed its influence in politics and society, while supporting free trade, personal liberties and secularization. The Catholics saw religious teachings as a fundamental basis for the state and society and opposed all attempts by the liberals to attack the church's official privileges. Initially, these factions existed only as informal groups with which prominent politicians were generally identified. The liberals held power over much of Leopold I's reign. An official Liberal Party was formed in 1846, although a formal Catholic Party was only established in 1869. Gradually, these political groups would also spread into Belgium's society, creating a process of social stratification known as pillarisation. Leopold, who was Protestant, tended to favor Liberals and shared their desire for reform, though he was not partisan.

Leopold I's reign was marked by an economic crisis which lasted until the late 1850s. In the aftermath of the revolution, the Dutch had closed the Scheldt to Belgian shipping, making the port of Antwerp effectively useless. The Netherlands and the Dutch colonies, which had been profitable markets for Belgian manufacturers before 1830, were totally closed to Belgian goods. The years between 1845 and 1849, known as the Crisis of the 1840s, were particularly hard in Flanders where harvests failed and a third of the population became dependent on poor relief. The period has been described as the "worst years of Flemish history". The economic situation in Flanders increased the internal migration to Brussels and the industrial areas of Wallonia, which continued throughout the period.

==== Upheaval of 1848 ====
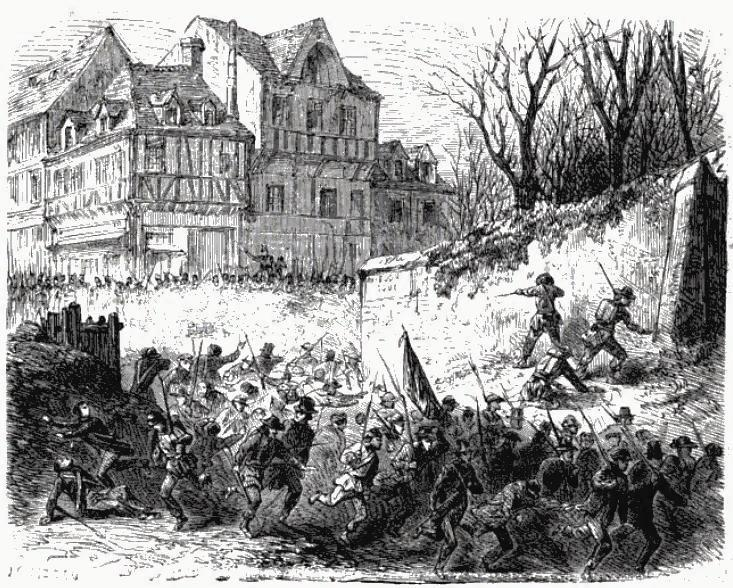
Fighting between revolutionaries and government troops at Risquons-Tout in 1848

By 1847, Belgium was suffering from economic destabilization as Belgian exporters faced increasing competition from new British firms. Radical parties like the Association Démocratique, founded in 1847 at the instigation of Karl Marx, who had briefly lived in Brussels in exile, actively agitated against the unpopular Liberal government under Charles Rogier. However, the success of the Liberals' economic reforms partially mitigated the effects of the economic downturn, which meant that Belgium was not as badly affected as its neighbors by the Revolutions of 1848. Nevertheless, in early 1848, a large number of radical publications appeared.

The most serious threat of the 1848 revolutions in Belgium was posed by Belgian émigré groups. Shortly after the revolution in France, Belgian migrant workers living in Paris were encouraged to return to Belgium to overthrow the monarchy and establish a republic. Around 6,000 armed émigrés of the Belgian Legion attempted to cross the Belgian frontier. The first group, travelling by train, was stopped and quickly disarmed at Quiévrain on 26 March 1848. The second group crossed the border on 29 March and headed for Brussels. They were confronted by Belgian troops at the hamlet of Risquons-Tout and, during fighting, seven émigrés were killed and most of the rest were captured. The defeat at Risquons-Tout effectively ended the revolutionary threat to Belgium. The situation stabilized that summer after a good harvest, and fresh elections returned a strong Liberal majority.

=== Reign of Leopold II ===
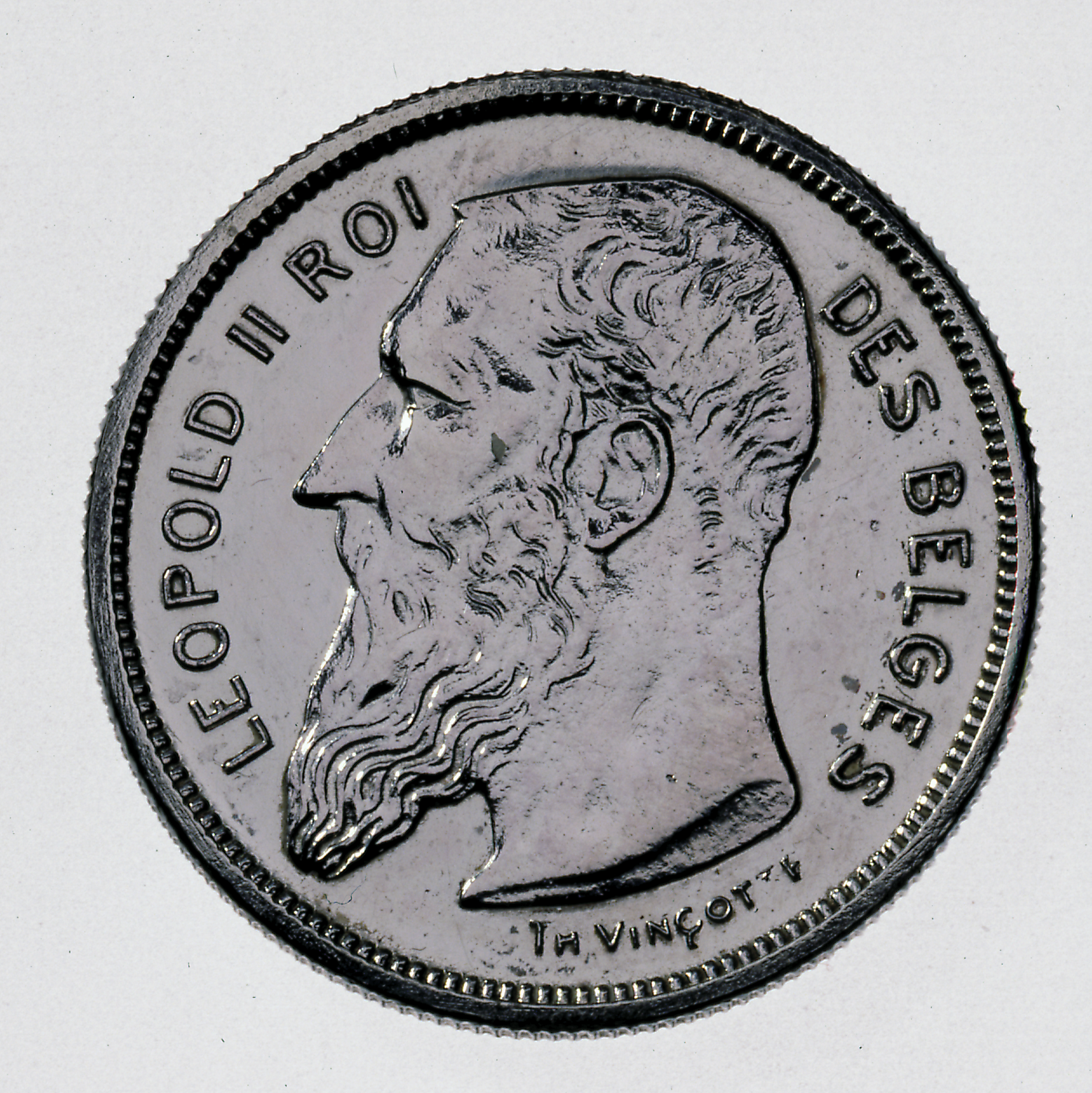
Leopold II, depicted on a coin

Leopold II was sworn in as king of the Belgians in 1865. His reign coincided with the Belle Époque and rapid economic expansion from the 1880s. It was characterized by the resurgence of the Catholic Party, political confrontation over military action, educational and franchise reform and his creation of a personal empire in Central Africa.

One of Leopold's long-term preoccupations was increasing the international standing and influence of his country. Throughout much of his early reign, Leopold hoped to regain the territories which had been ceded to the Netherlands in 1839, particularly Luxembourg, which he viewed as an integral piece of Belgian territory. He also pushed for the implementation of conscription and reforms to the military, many of which would only be realized after his death. From the 1870s, he tried to persuade several Belgian prime ministers to support the creation of an overseas colony in the Far East or Africa to increase Belgian wealth and political influence. After being repeatedly turned down, he launched a personal venture to colonize the Congo river basin in central Africa, without the backing or support of the Belgian state. Some of the vast personal wealth he accumulated from the colony was spent on construction of grandiose public buildings across Belgium, earning him the nickname "Builder King" (roi batisseur).

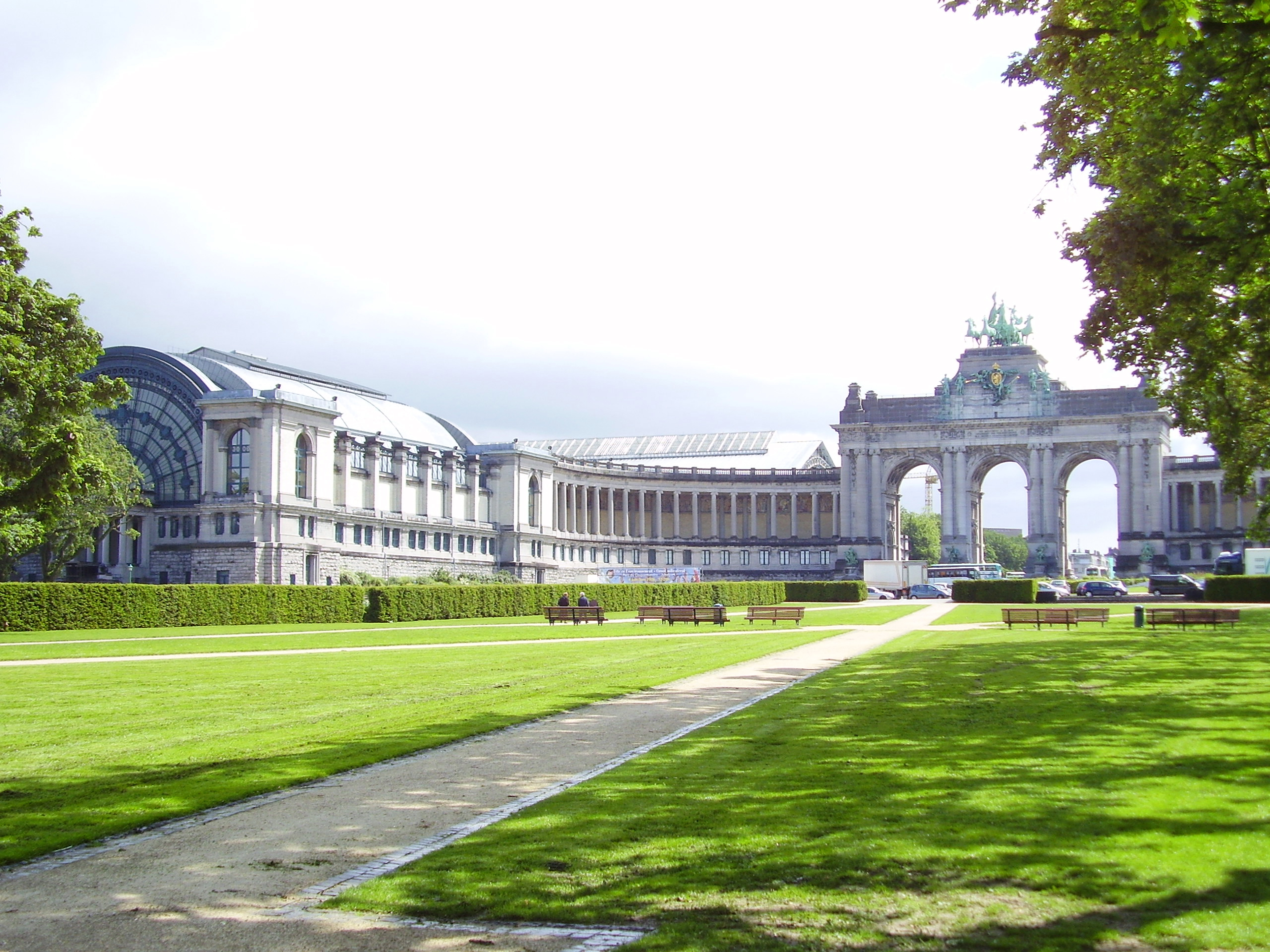
View of the Cinquantenaire park and arch, started under Leopold II in 1880. It was only finished in 1905.

Most of these projects were focused in Brussels, where he constructed two large palaces, (Note: The Palace of Laeken, complete with huge greenhouses, and the smaller Palace of Brussels.) and Ostend, where a vast colonnaded arcade was built along the seafront in an attempt to turn the town into a fashionable seaside resort. During Leopold's reign, Belgium hosted five prestigious World Exhibitions, in 1885, 1888, 1894, 1897 and 1905, as well as a major national exhibition in 1880 to mark the 50th anniversary of Belgian independence.

Politically, Leopold disliked the Socialist party, preferring to negotiate with the Catholic Party, which held power for much of his reign. He was widely distrusted by politicians, who saw him as meddling in state business and seeking to expand the power of the monarchy. Towards the end of his reign, public awareness of the atrocities committed under his colonial regime, as well as his marital infidelity, led to a significant fall the monarchy's popularity. Following his death in December 1909, his funeral cortege was booed.

Although Belgium was officially neutral throughout his reign, significant numbers of Belgians volunteered to fight for right-wing causes abroad. From 1860, large numbers of Belgian Catholic volunteers went to Italy in an ultimately unsuccessful attempt to defend the independence of the Papal States against Giuseppe Garibaldi's revolutionaries. The Zouaves, as they were known, were ultimately unsuccessful and the Papal States fell in 1870. A volunteer Belgian Legion fought alongside French forces in the Mexican Adventure from 1864 on behalf of Mexican Emperor Maximilian I, whose wife was the daughter of Leopold I. The unit suffered heavy casualties at the Battle of Tacámbaro in 1865, and after heavy fighting was disbanded in December 1866.

==== "Belgian Question" and Franco-Prussian War ====
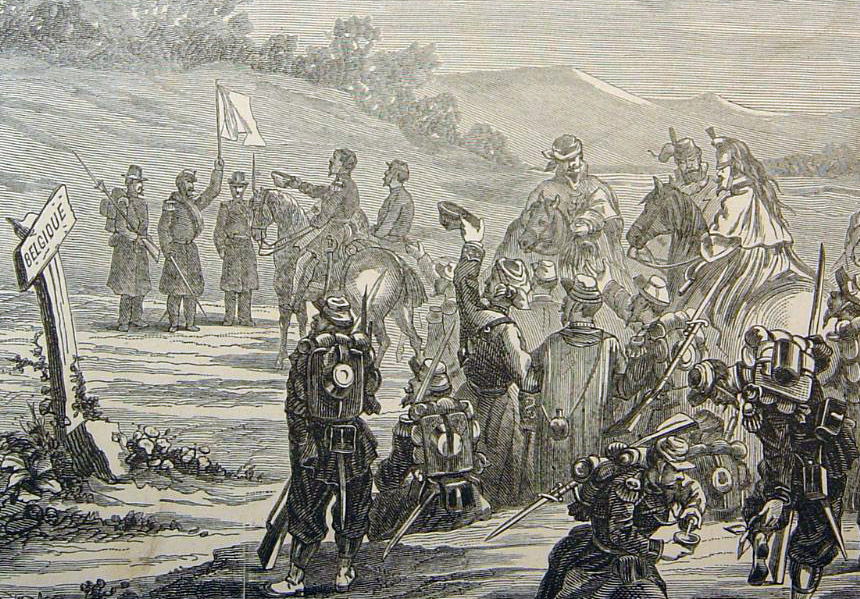
French and Belgian troops stand off at the border during the Franco-Prussian War

When the Franco-Prussian War broke out in July 1870, Belgium was confronted with the greatest threat to its independence since 1848. Shortly before the conflict, a draft treaty from the Austro-Prussian War of 1866 between Napoleon III and German Chancellor Otto von Bismarck discussing the annexation of Belgium as the price for French neutrality was made public. Napoleon III had also attempted to annex Luxembourg into the French Empire in 1868, which seemed to contemporaries a parallel of Belgium. European powers worried that French encroachment into Belgium would destabilize the Concert of Europe. The issue became known as the "Belgian Question". As the conflict began, Leopold and his advisors believed that either France or Prussia might try to outflank their opponent by disregarding Belgian neutrality and launching an invasion. The Belgian army was mobilized on the same day that both French and Prussian reserves were called up. As French troops moved towards the border, panic ensued in Belgium. The national gold reserves were evacuated to the National Redoubt fortress at Antwerp. After a restatement of the British guarantee of Belgian neutrality by Prime Minister Gladstone, Belgium was able to remain neutral, though much of the fighting (including the pivotal battle of Sedan) occurred just south of the Belgian border. More crucially, the mobilization of the Belgian army, which was divided into a mobile Army of Observation to guard the frontier and the static Army of Antwerp to hold the National Redoubt, revealed key structural problems in the military, particularly with the system of conscription. Events also re-emphasized the importance of the Treaty of London to Belgium's survival.

==== Military reform ====
Leopold viewed a strong military as the key to maintaining Belgian independence against France and, after the Franco-Prussian War, an expansionist Germany. After cutting the defense budget in the 1860s, the government was advised by a military commission to increase the size of the army and to abolish the system of Remplacement, whereby rich Belgians selected for military service by lot could pay for a substitute to take their place. Leopold II personally lobbied successive governments to implement the findings of the report and institute a fundamental reform of the army. Reform was opposed by both the Liberal and Catholic Parties, which viewed the army with suspicion and Remplacement as a key civil right. In a move supported only by the socialists, Remplacement was abolished in 1909. This was the last legal document signed before Leopold's death. Under the new system, one son per family would be liable for military service regardless of social class but the total size of the military remained the same.

Although military reform was delayed until the end of his reign, Leopold did succeed in convincing parliament of the need to extend Belgium's defenses. Construction of fortresses along the border by both the French and Germans in the mid-1880s worried the Belgian government that their country might be used as an invasion route. In 1887, a program of fortification construction began along the Sambre and Meuse rivers. Designed by the leading military architect Henri Alexis Brialmont, nine forts were built at Namur to guard against an offensive from France, while twelve were built around Liège, near the German border. Completed in 1892, they supplemented the existing National Redoubt at Antwerp, which was later modernized and extended. The fortifications would play a major role in the opening stages of the First World War.

==== School War ====
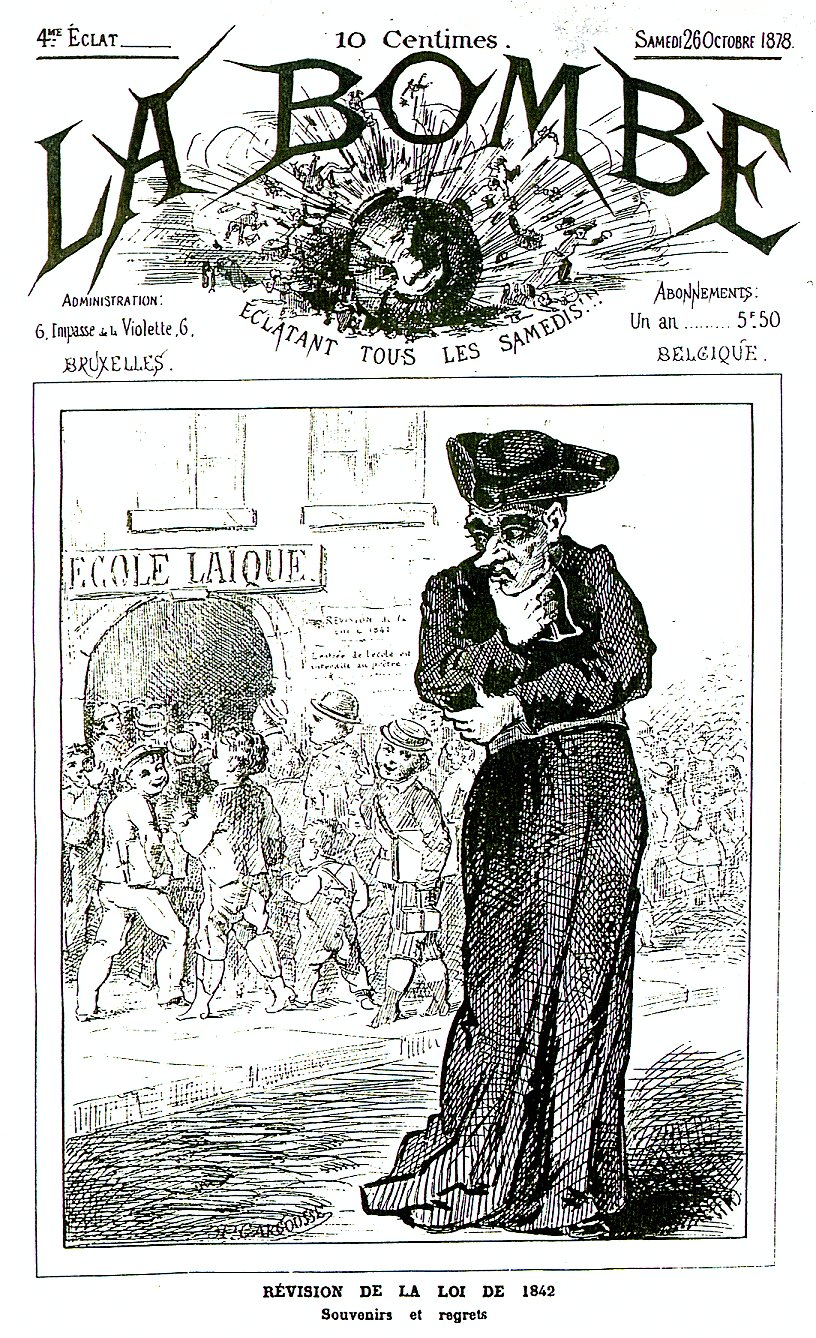
The pro-Liberal magazine La Bombe depicts a priest watching children flock to secular schools.

The political rivalry between Liberal and Catholic parties peaked between 1879 and 1884, when they clashed on the issue of religion in primary education. In June 1879, a Liberal majority government under Walthère Frère-Orban succeeded in passing an Education Act secularizing primary education across the country, starting the so-called First School War. New "neutral" schools funded by the local communes with assistance from national government were to be established in all municipalities, while Catholic schools were to receive no support at all. Outraged at the perceived challenge to its authority, the Catholic church encouraged a boycott of the schools. Though 3,885 secular schools opened across the country by 1883, attendance in private Catholic schools rose from 13 percent to over 60 percent of eligible students.

After elections in 1884, a Catholic government under Jules Malou passed a new Education Law providing public financial support for religious schools. Religious education became compulsory in all schools in 1895. The Catholic Party's triumph in the issue was another blow to the already-weakened Liberal Party, and ushered in a period of almost unbroken Catholic government until World War II.

==== Colonialism ====
Even before his accession to the throne in 1865, Leopold began lobbying leading Belgian politicians to create a colonial empire in the Far East or Africa, which would expand Belgian prestige. Politically, however, colonization was extremely unpopular, as it was perceived as a risky and expensive gamble with no obvious benefit to the country and his many attempts were rejected: Walthère Frère-Orban, liberal prime minister from 1878–84, wrote that:

Belgium does not need a colony. Belgians are not drawn towards overseas enterprises: they prefer to spend their energy and capital in countries which have already been explored or on less risky schemes ... Still, you can assure His Majesty of my whole-hearted sympathy for the generous plan he had conceived, as long as the Congo does not make any international difficulties for us.

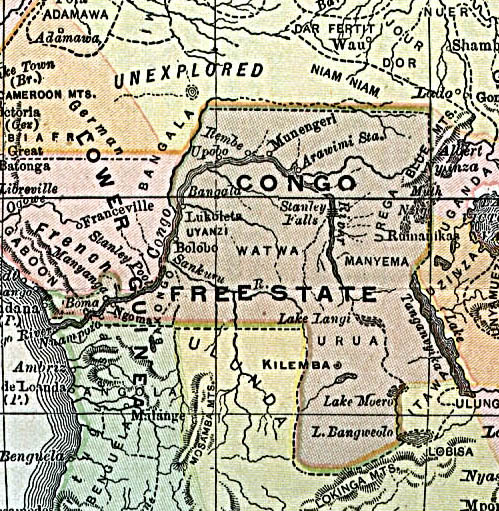
Map of the Congo Free State in 1892

Determined to look for a colony for himself and inspired by recent reports from central Africa, Leopold began patronizing a number of leading explorers, including Henry Morton Stanley. Leopold established the International African Association, a charitable organization to oversee the exploration and surveying of a territory based around the Congo River, with the stated goal of bringing humanitarian assistance and civilization to the natives. In the Berlin Conference of 1884–85, European leaders officially recognized Leopold's control over the 1,000,000 square miles (2,600,000 km^{2}) of the notionally-independent Congo Free State.

Leopold, however, reneged on his humanitarian promises, and instead brutally exploited the locals and the land to gain what profit he could. Initially, the Congo Free State relied on exporting ivory to pay for its upkeep and to fund the Congo Arab war and Emin Pasha Relief Expedition in the Eastern Congo. As rubber became an important resource in the 1890s, it quickly surpassed ivory as a profitable export, which allowed the colony to become extremely profitable for the first time. Monopoly concessions to collect rubber in large areas of territory were sold to private companies, and the Force Publique, the state's private army, was used to force locals to collect it. In some cases, Congolese people who failed to meet their quota were killed or had one of their hands cut off. The system was immensely profitable, but the population of the Congo is thought to have been reduced by as many as ten million during the period that the colony was under Leopold's control. (Note: Since the first census in the Congo was taken in 1923, all population estimates during the period are guesses. Current estimates of the reduction during the period range between three million and fifteen million caused by a combination of violence, disease and reduced birth rate.)

Eventually, growing scrutiny of Leopold's regime led to a popular campaign movement, centered in Britain and America, to force Leopold to renounce his ownership of the Congo. The "Belgian solution" they proposed was for Belgium to annex it in order to end the overexploitation without disrupting the delicate balance of power in colonial Africa. In 1908, as a direct result of this campaign, Belgium formally annexed the territory, creating the Belgian Congo.

==== Rise of socialism and franchise extension ====
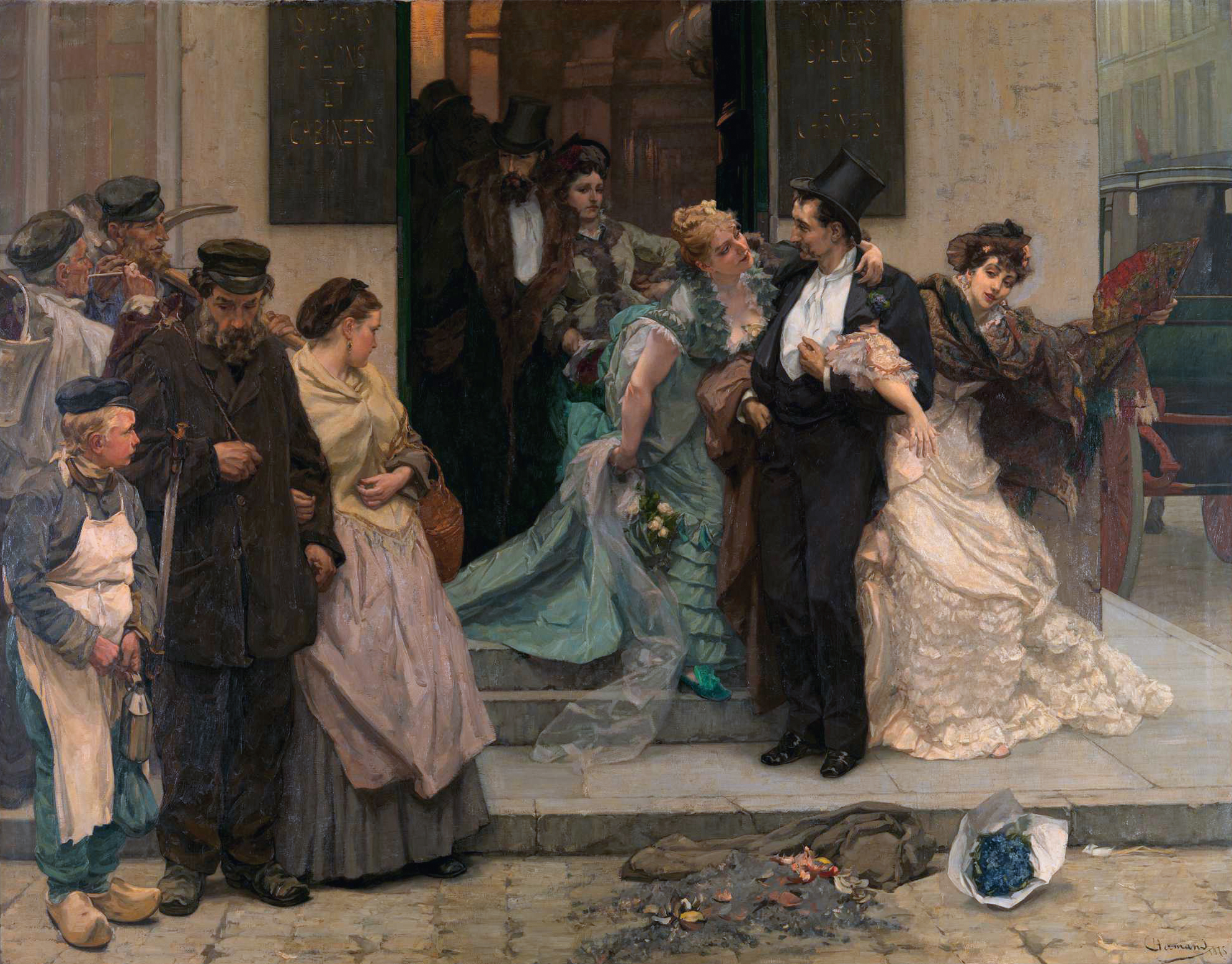
At Dawn (1875) by Charles Hermans depicts 19th-century Belgium's class inequality.

The reign of Leopold II saw the rise of organized socialist political groups and parties, most notably among the industrial workers in Wallonia. The early socialist movement was characterized by a successful co-operative movement in Flanders. Trade unions were legalized in 1866, opening the way to organized labor politics. The International Workingmen's Association held its first conference outside Switzerland in Brussels in 1868 as Belgian socialism, under figures such as César De Paepe, expanded dramatically.

The first real socialist political party in the country, the Belgian Workers' Party (POB-BWP), was founded in 1885. The small numbers of workers who were allowed to vote in general elections meant that it achieved little success via conventional political channels. In 1886, rioting and violence broke out among industrial workers in Liège, then spread across Wallonia, and was only repressed by the military. Numerous politicians of the Workers' Party were arrested by the government in the subsequent backlash, but a wave of industrial legislation, including reforms to ban child labor and limit working hours, were introduced in the aftermath of the strike. The government reaction to the strikes and their bloody repression were criticized by contemporaries, including Karl Marx who wrote in The Belgian Massacres (1869) that:

There exists but one country in the civilised world where every strike is eagerly and joyously turned into a pretext for the official massacre of the Working Class. That country of single blessedness is Belgium! the [sic] model state of continental constitutionalism, the snug, well-hedged, little paradise of the landlord, the capitalist, and the priest. ... The massacre of this year does not differ from last year's massacre, but by the ghastlier number of its victims, the more hideous ferocity of an otherwise ridiculous army, the noisier jubilation of the clerical and capitalist press, and the intensified frivolity of the pretexts put forward by the governmental butchers.

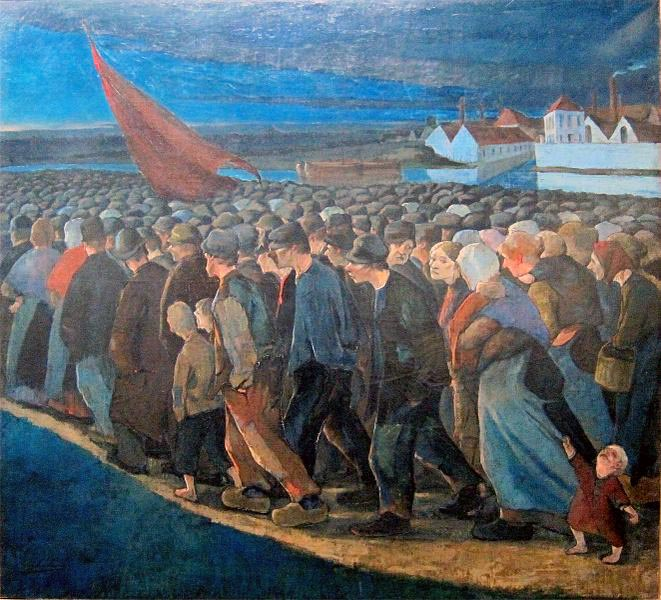
Un soir de grève (1893) by Eugène Laermans. Belgian strikers wave red banners during the huge general strike of 1893.

Despite making a rapid recovery, the Belgian Workers' Party was still penalized by the Belgian electoral system, which based suffrage on wealth, stopping most of the party's support base among industrial workers from voting. In August 1885, the party began its Antwerp Programme, which called for universal suffrage while confirming the party's intention to pursue its goals through parliamentary democracy rather than revolution. The culmination of this policy was the 1893 Belgian General Strike, involving some 250,000 workers. Fearing a revolution, the government adopted universal male suffrage in 1894, but only with plural voting, which allowed up to two additional votes for wealthy or educated citizens. Nevertheless, the percentage of the population eligible to vote rose from 3.9 to 37.3 percent, and in the 1894 elections the socialists won 28 of 152 seats. The Belgian Workers' Party called two further unsuccessful general strikes in 1902 and 1913 in an attempt to end the plural voting system.

The new voting system increased the socialists' influence in parliament significantly, but its major beneficiaries were the Catholic Party. Partly as a result of the creation of a Catholic populist challenger, the Christian People's Party, the Catholic Party embraced the new ideology of Social Catholicism introduced following the papal Rerum novarum encyclical of 1891. This gained it considerable popular support, especially in Flanders. In 1894, the Belgian Workers' Party adopted the Charter of Quaregnon, which would form the basis of its ideology until 1979. By 1911, the party had 276,000 members, making it one of the most successful Socialist parties in Europe. As a result of lobbying by the Belgian Workers' Party, Belgium was one of the first countries in Europe to launch a comprehensive social insurance scheme, including sickness compensation (from 1894), voluntary old-age insurance (1900) and unemployment insurance (1907). The big losers from voting reform were the Liberals who lost almost all their parliamentary representation in the years between 1894 and 1900.

=== Reign of Albert I (to 1914) ===
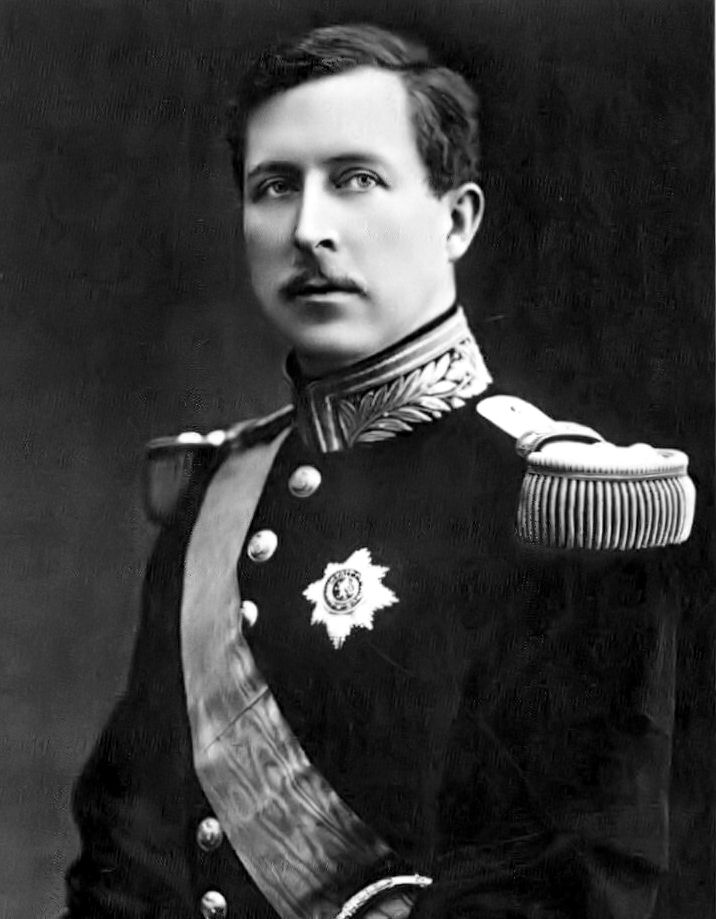
Portrait of Albert I

Albert I inherited the throne after the death of Leopold II in 1909. His rule ended with his death in 1934, encompassing the final half-decade of the long 19th century and continuing through the First World War and into the Interbellum. The period 1909 to 1913 was marked by continued economic confidence, and two World's fair were hosted in Belgium in 1910 and in 1913.

In 1913, a huge general strike took place across the country at the instigation of the Belgian Workers' Party on the issue of voting rights. The system of plural voting, in force since 1893, was extremely unpopular because of its perceived unfairness, but also because the system tended to favor the Catholic Party. Although between 300,000 and 450,000 workers were involved, the strike was ultimately unsuccessful. The party voted in favor ending the strike and taking future action by parliamentary means, on 22 April 1913.

The issue of military reform, which had been extremely contentious right up to the end of Leopold II's reign, continued to be important up to the outbreak of the First World War. Under the influence of pro-militarist lobbying, expansion and further reform of the army was discussed in parliament, and a new system of universal military conscription was adopted in 1913.

==== Prelude to World War I ====
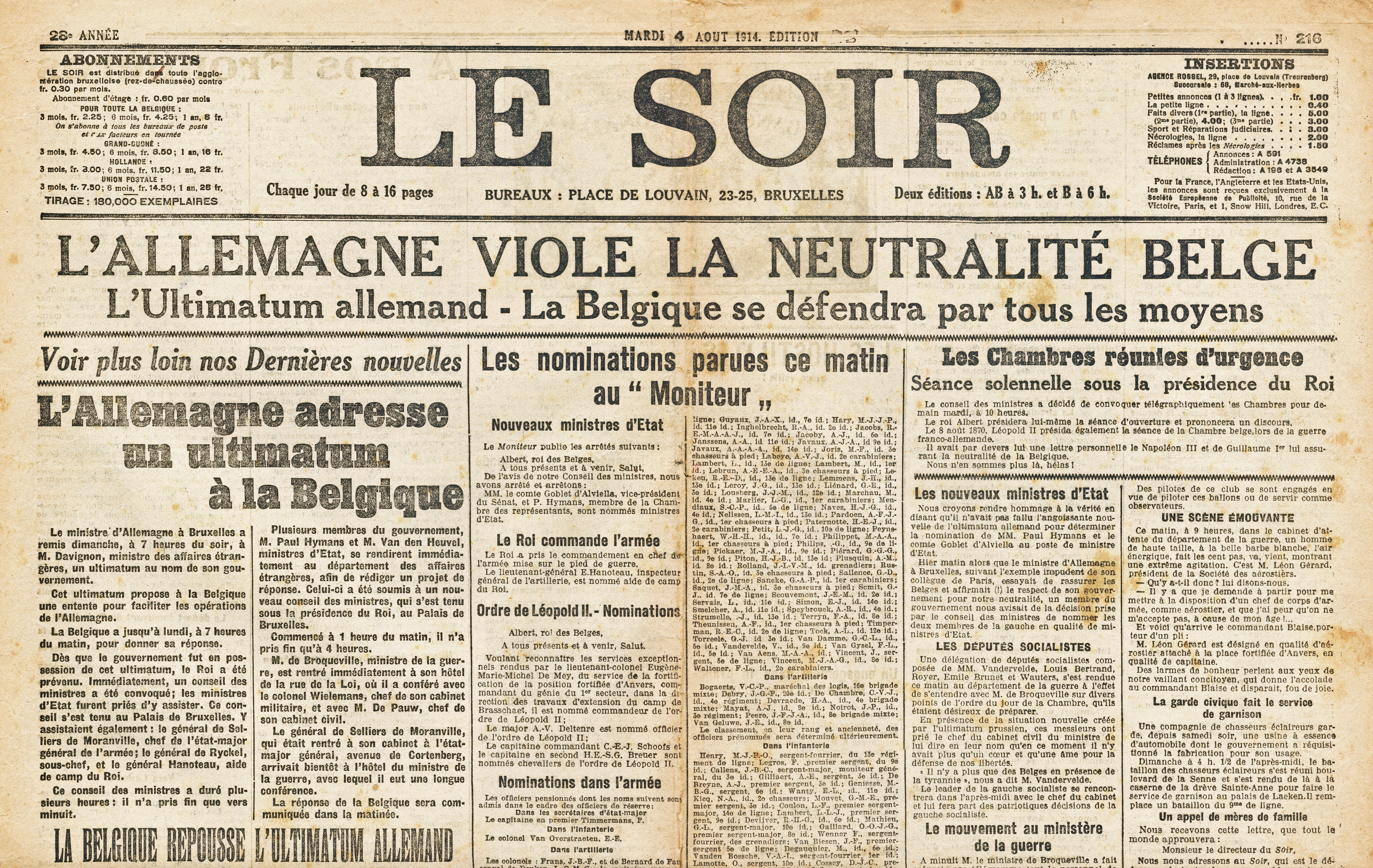
"Germany Violates Belgian Neutrality." Headline in Le Soir, 4 August 1914.

From as early as 1904, Alfred von Schlieffen of the German General Staff began to draw up a military strategy, known as the Schlieffen Plan, which could be put into action if Germany found itself involved in a two-front war against France and Russia. The core of the plan was a rapid attack on France on the outbreak of war, forcing a quick victory in the west before the Russians had time to fully mobilize their forces. The Schlieffen Plan took advantage of the French military's concentration and fortifications along the Franco-German border by prescribing an invasion of neutral Belgium and Luxembourg. According to the plan, the German army would rapidly overwhelm the Belgian military and then move quickly through the country and then towards Paris. The general staff believed that none of the signatories would be willing to honor their commitments from the 1839 Treaty of London, which a German diplomat dismissed as a "scrap of paper".

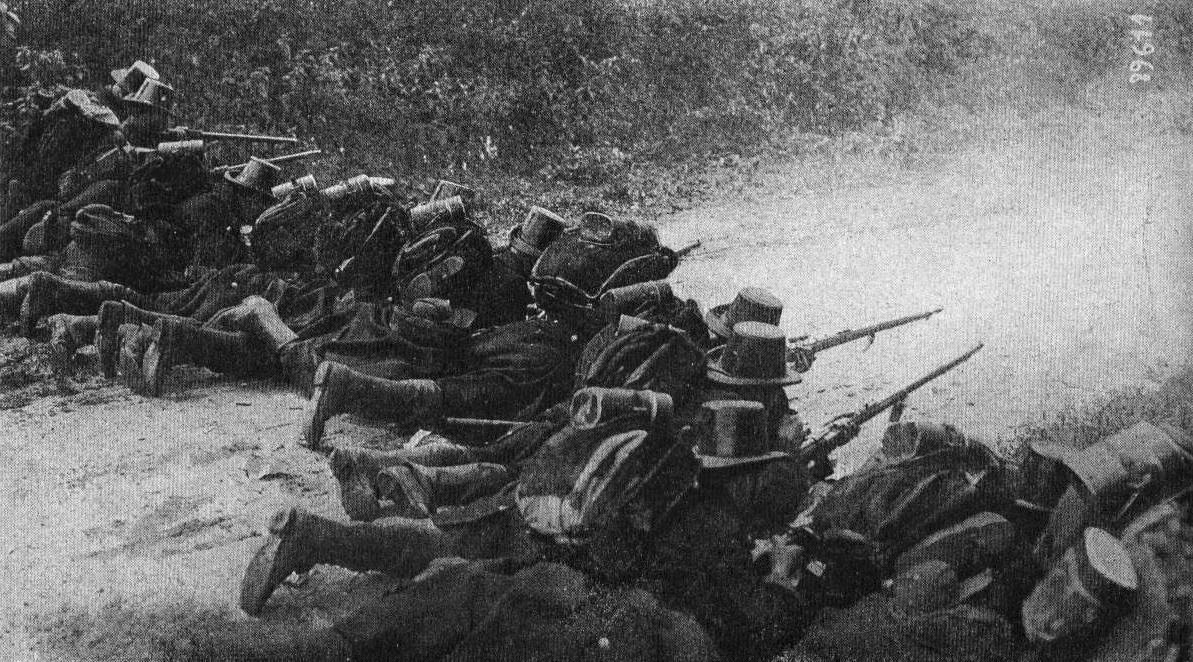
Belgian troops at the Battle of Liège in August 1914

On 2 August 1914, following the events leading to the outbreak of World War I, the Germans presented an ultimatum to the Belgian government demanding permission to move German soldiers through the country. The ultimatum stated that Belgian independence would be reinstated upon German victory and that reparations would be made afterwards. Luxembourg was invaded and occupied by the Germans the same day. On 3 August, the Belgian government rejected the proposal and the German invasion began. Britain gave Germany an ultimatum, demanding that it end the invasion by midnight, but Germany let the deadline pass. Contrary to the Germans' expectations, Britain, along with the British Empire, declared war on Germany as the Treaty of London had demanded.

The reorganization of the Belgian army that had begun in 1913 was only due to be completed in 1926. Consequently at the outbreak of war, the Belgian army was under-strength and largely unprepared. Albert I took personal command of the 265,000-strong Belgian army. However, they could do little against the 1.5 million-strong German invading force. Between August and October 1914, the Germans took the fortified cities of Liège, Namur and Antwerp and occupied Brussels. The fortified positions proved little match for the greatly improved siege artillery available to the Germans at the time, although the greater-than-expected defence did buy some time for the French and British to react. By the end of October, the Belgian army had been forced into a small pocket along the Yser river in the far west. In a surprising victory, the Belgian army managed to halt the German advance at the Yser, paving the way for the static trench warfare that which would characterize the Western Front for the next four years. Most of Belgium, however, was occupied by Germany and would remain under German control until 1918.

== Themes ==
=== Industrialisation ===
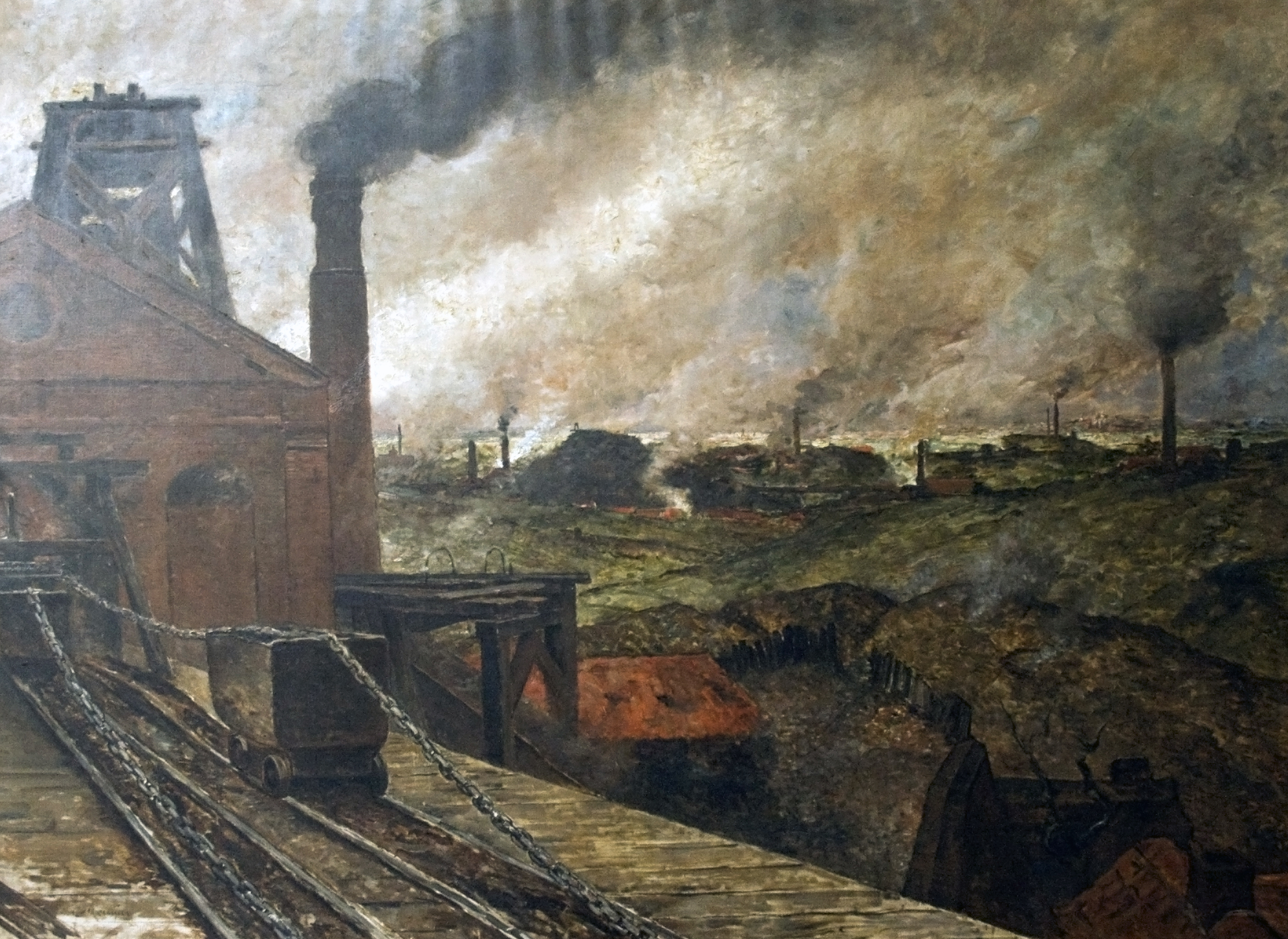
View of mines in the Borinage region in the 1890s by Constantin Meunier

Belgium was the first country in continental Europe to experience the Industrial Revolution, and was the most intensively industrialized country in the world throughout most of the period. Belgium industrialized rapidly over the 19th century, with a focus on iron, coal and textile production. By 1914, Belgium had extensive rail networks, mines and factories, and a productive export sector.

The Industrial Revolution is usually considered to have been spread from Britain to Belgium by two British industrialists, William and John Cockerill, who moved to Liège in 1807 and formed a company producing industrial machinery and iron. Industrial development was possible in Belgium because of large coal deposits located in the Sillon industriel along the Sambre-Meuse river valley. Although the town of Ghent, a centre of cotton production in Flanders, industrialised rapidly, the effects of the Industrial Revolution were most felt in Wallonia, particularly in the cities of Mons, Charleroi, Liège and Verviers. By the 1840s, Cockerill was the world's largest manufacturer of steel. Belgium also rapidly developed a large railway system. From the outset, the Belgian state supported the construction of railways, envisaging a railway link between the industrial region of Mons and the port of Antwerp via Brussels. The first stretch of this line, one of the first railways in Europe, opened in 1835 between Brussels and Mechelen.

Belgian firms initially copied and mass-produced British designs, but soon began specializing in railway materials, chemicals, weapons and raw materials. These items were all widely exported, making Belgium one of the foremost industrial powers in the world. One of the most successful exporters was Édouard Empain, nicknamed the "Tramway King", whose company ran infrastructure projects across Europe, Asia and South America. Empain's projects included the Paris Métro system, completed in 1900, and the entire Egyptian suburb of Heliopolis, which was finished in 1905.

=== Language division ===
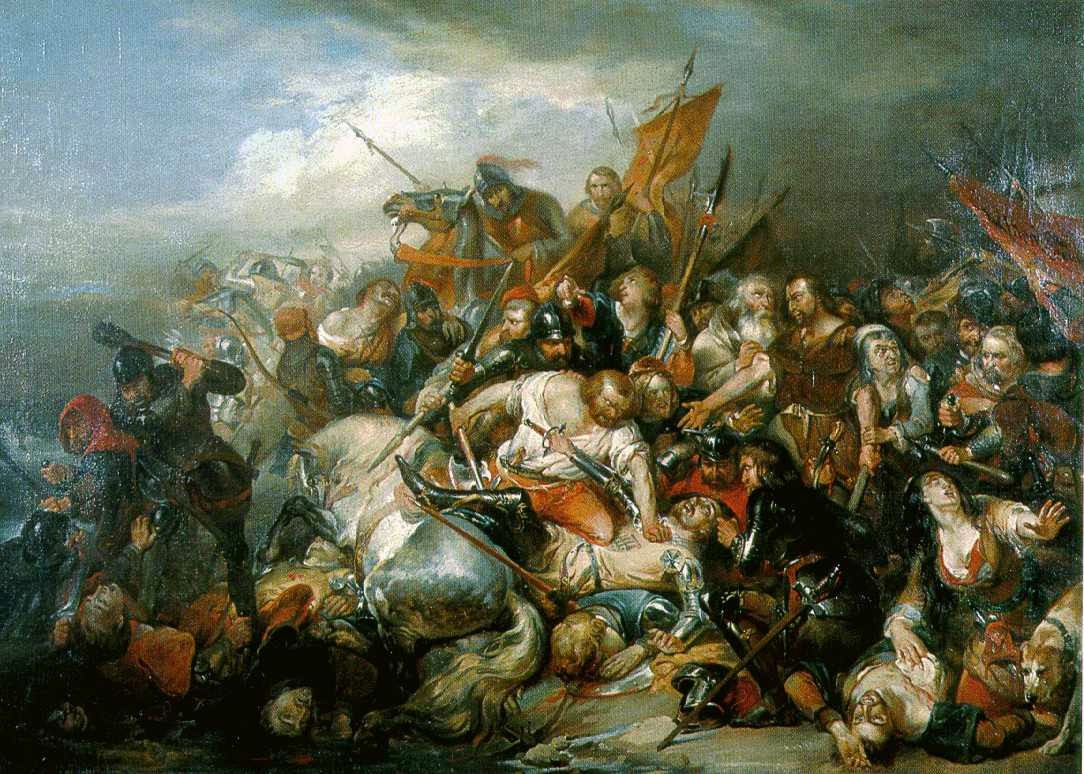
1836 depiction of the Battle of the Golden Spurs by Nicaise de Keyser. Evoking Flemish history played a central role in the development of the Flemish Movement.

As the independent state of Belgium consolidated after the Revolution, the issue of a consensus language in the country became an increasingly important political question. At the start of the period, French was the dominant language, and was the only language that was approved for use in legal and government business anywhere in the country. It was also the language of the economic and social elite, even in Flanders. By the 1860s, with Flemish dialects in decline, increasing numbers of Flemish people of all social classes were bilingual, paralleling a similar decline in northern France. However, partly inspired by a resurgence in Flemish literature and culture, the Flamingant political movement began to develop, with their first political parties formed in the 1860s and 70s. Political agitation by Flamingant groups, often directed by local priests, led to Belgium becoming officially bilingual in 1870. Teaching Dutch in all secondary schools in Flanders became compulsory, reinforcing the language's presence. By 1898, Dutch was officially recognized as an equal language to French in legal matters. During the first decades of the 20th century, the Flemish Movement became increasingly radicalized and began to develop as a mass political movement (although not a united one), fully emerging during the First World War.

In the 1880s, a Walloon Movement began to emerge in parallel to the Flemish Movement. The early Walloon Movement developed in reaction to the perceived discrimination against French language as Dutch was progressively accorded equality. At the same time, the movement called on a "Walloon identity" rather than a Belgian one. In his famous Lettre au roi sur la séparation de la Wallonie et de la Flandre ("Letter to the King on the separation of Wallonia and Flanders") published in 1912, the Walloon socialist Jules Destrée argued that the language division in Belgium was irreconcilable, famously stating that "In Belgium, there are the Walloons and the Flemish. There are no Belgians."

=== Literature ===
The 19th century saw a flourishing of Belgian literature in both French and Dutch languages. In Flanders, the Literary Romanticist movement, aided by a renewed interest in Belgium's medieval past, flourished under authors including Hendrik Conscience, who is credited as "father of the Flemish novel", and poets like Theodoor van Rijswijck. Conscience's most famous work, De Leeuw van Vlaanderen ("The Lion of Flanders", 1838), portrayed a romantic and heavily embellished account of the County of Flanders' fight against the French in the 14th century, with the Flemish victory at the Battle of the Golden Spurs in 1302 as the centerpiece. De Leeuw van Vlaanderen became a source of inspiration for the Flemish Movement and remains one of the best examples of Flemish literature.

From the 1860s, Flemish literature began to reflect the Realist style already popular in France, under writers such as Anton Bergmann and Virginie Loveling. The works feature detailed depictions of ordinary aspects of daily life and often have a pessimistic tone. Heavily influenced by Belgian dialects such as West Flemish, the poet and priest Guido Gezelle produced lyric poems in Dutch from the 1850s until his death in 1899. In 1893, the cultural magazine Van Nu en Straks ("Of Today and Tomorrow") was launched to bring Flemish literature to an audience outside Belgium. Flemish literature continued to flourish in the first decades of the 20th century under writers such as Stijn Streuvels.

In Wallonia, literature in French began a revival in 1881 with the creation of the La Jeune Belgique ("The Young Belgium") movement, which supported the creation of distinctively Belgian literature and opposed romanticism. Among the members of the Jeune Belgique were the writer Camille Lemonnier, whose works were often set against the background of Belgian peasant life in the naturalist style, and the poet Charles Van Lerberghe. French language poetry flourished in Belgium in the early 20th century under Émile Verhaeren and Maurice Maeterlinck; Maeterlinck was awarded the Nobel Prize in 1911.

== See also ==
- Antoinism – a Spiritualist cult founded in Belgium in 1910
- Christianity in the 19th century
- France in the long 19th century
- Fashion in the 19th century
- 19th-century philosophy
