= Belgian general strike of 1893 =

1893 work stoppage in Belgium in support of universal male suffrage

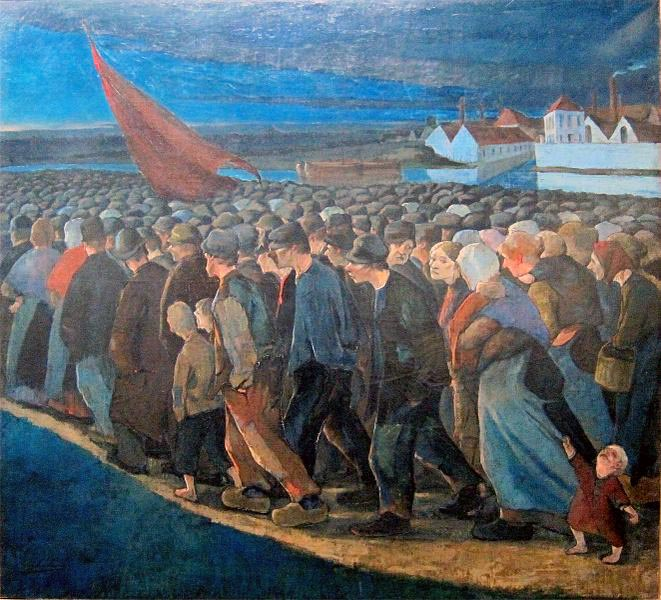
Un soir de grève (1893) by Eugène Laermans

The general strike of 1893 (French: grève générale de 1893, Dutch: algemene staking van 1893) was a major general strike in Belgium in April 1893 called by the Belgian Labour Party (POB–BWP) to pressure the government of Auguste Beernaert to introduce universal male suffrage in elections. The general strike was the first called in Belgium and a decisive moment for the nascent socialist movement in Belgium. According to the historian Carl J. Strikwerda, it was the first true general strike in the history of Europe.

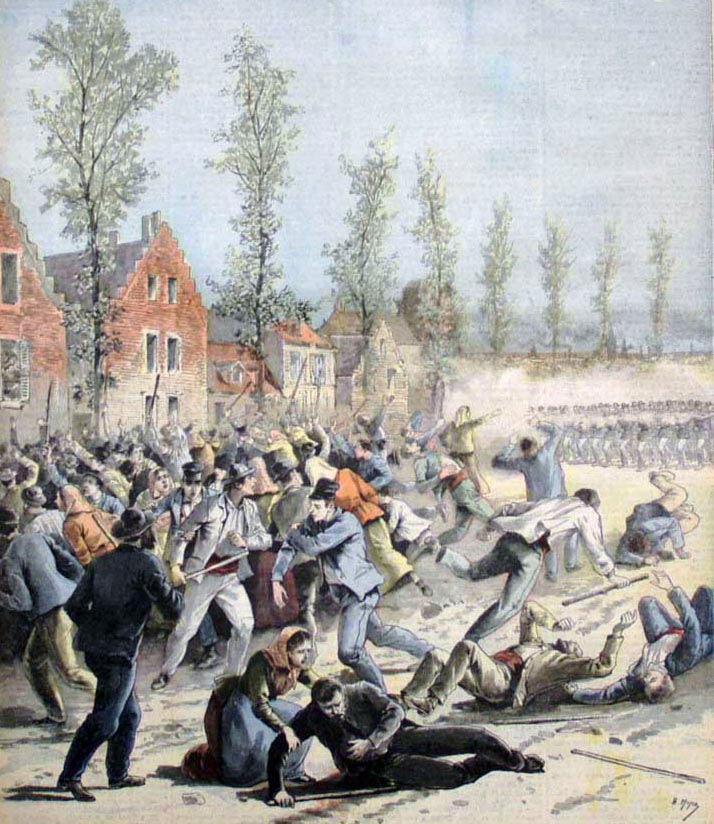
Illustration from Le Petit Journal of the Garde Civique firing on strikers near Mons on 17 April 1893

The general strike was called on the evening of 11 April 1893 after politicians of Catholic and Liberal parties joined to block a proposal to expand the suffrage, by giving the vote to all male citizens over the age of 25, and giving two votes to heads of families.

The general strike lasted six days, 12–18 April. Conservatives, led by the Catholic Prime Minister Auguste Beernaert, feared a full revolution and ordered the military to confront the strikers. Security forces killed between 13 and 20 strikers.

According to Henri Pirenne, the strike was only called under pressure from the miners of the Borinage. The number of workers who went out on strike surprised the POB–BWP leadership, under Emile Vandervelde. In total, approximately 200,000 workers participated in the strike.

== Results of the strike ==
In the face of the determined opposition, the Parliament agreed to the Socialist demands and adopted the blocked reforms, increasing the franchise ten-fold, but still excluding women.

The first elections under the reformed franchise took place in October 1894. It did not benefit the POB–BWP as much as expected. The rise of Social Catholicism, introduced by the Papal encyclical Rerum novarum in 1891, helped to slow socialist growth. The elections however brought socialist deputies into parliament for the first time and began the Liberals' decline from one of the two dominant parties in Belgian politics. Neal Ascherson argued that, after 1894, "the deepest preoccupation of politics was the determination of Catholic and Liberal to keep the Socialists out of power." The POB-BWP adopted a new manifesto, the Charter of Quaregnon, the same year which would remain the party's doctrine until 1979.

The issue of electoral reform remained controversial until World War I and further general strikes on questions of franchise reform occurred in 1902 and 1913. The 1913 strike lead to a promise of limits on or abolition of the plural voting system, but the reform was halted by the outbreak of World War I and German occupation. Plural voting was finally abolished in 1919. Universal suffrage, giving the vote to all Belgian women, was not adopted until 1948.

== See also ==
- Belgian strike of 1886, the closest precedent for the 1893 general strike
- General strikes in Belgium
- Belgium in the long nineteenth century

== Notes and references ==
=== Bibliography ===
- Ascherson, Neal (1999) [1963]. The King Incorporated: Leopold the Second and the Congo (New ed.). London: Granta. ISBN 1862072906.
- Merkx, Kris; Deruette, Serge (1999). La Vie en Rose: Réalités de l'Histoire du Parti socialiste en Belgique. Brussels: EPO. ISBN 2872621474.
- Strikwerda, Carl (1997). A House Divided: Catholics, Socialists, and Flemish Nationalists in Nineteenth-century Belgium. Lanham, Md.: Rowman & Littlefield. ISBN 978-0847685271.
