= Coremans-De Vriendt law =

Belgian law enforcing legal equality of the Dutch and French languages

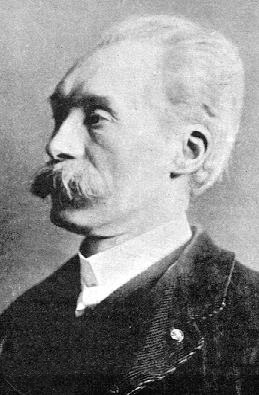
Juliaan De Vriendt, who proposed the law with Edward Coremans

The Coremans-De Vriendt Law, also dubbed the Law of Equality (Dutch: Gelijkheidswet), was a Belgian law passed on 18 April 1898 which enforced formal legal equality of the Dutch and French languages in the country. It is seen as a landmark in the history of the Flemish Movement and of linguistic equality in Belgium.

The law was named after two Flemish deputies, Juliaan De Vriendt and Edward Coremans, who proposed the law. The law decreed equal validity for legal texts written in both French and Dutch, as well as decreeing bilingual signage in Flanders. As a result, parliamentary debates could be held in both languages and henceforth all laws were voted, passed and published in legally equivalent French and Dutch versions.

The law followed a period of greater official acceptance of Dutch, starting in around 1886 when coins became bilingual. Its enactment, along with the introduction of universal male suffrage (but with plural voting) in 1893, caused the Flemish Movement to enter a "third stage" of mass-membership - facilitated also by the major electoral reform of 1899.
