= Charter of Quaregnon =

1894 political manifesto

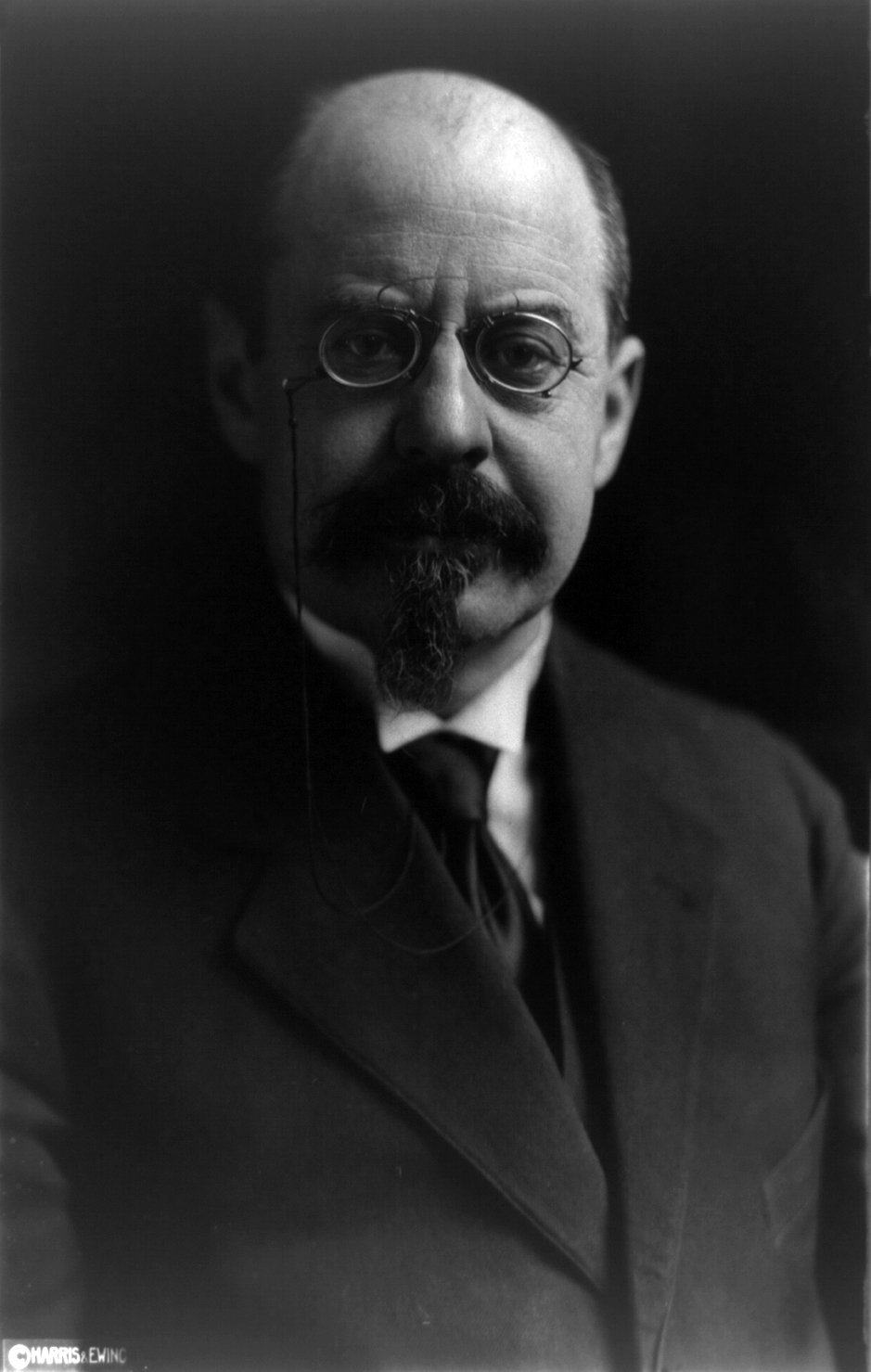
Émile Vandervelde, pictured in 1919, played an influential role in drafting the Charter.

The Charter of Quaregnon (French: Charte de Quaregnon, Dutch: Charter van Quaregnon) was a political manifesto agreed in 1894 which formed the doctrinal basis for successive socialist parties in Belgium until 1979.

In 1894, Belgian elections were, for the first time, held according to the scheme of the plural right to vote under the pressure of the violent Belgian general strike of 1893. That meant that for the Belgian Labour Party (POB-BWP), workers for the first time could vote, and representatives from the party, ten years after its foundation, could enter the Belgian parliament. With a doctrinarian charter, the program of the socialist party was presented to the electorate. Out of several ideas, Émile Vandervelde chose this proposition, which was adopted at the Easter Congress of the Socialist Party, at Quaregnon, near Mons, in Hainaut Province, on 25 and 26 March 1894. It became known as the Charter of Quaregnon. The charter was strongly influenced by ideas of the French socialist Jules Guesde.

As a doctrinal source of inspiration for the Belgian Socialists, the Charter of Quaregnon remained in place for two world wars and many years. Only after 1979, when the Belgian Socialist Party (PSB-BSP) divided into the Dutch-speaking Socialistische Partij (SP) and the French-speaking Parti Socialiste (PS), newer charters were created.

== Text ==
Charter of Quaregnon

- 1. Wealth in general, and the means of production in particular, are natural resources, or the result of manual or intellectual labour of former generations, as well as of the present generation; consequently they must be considered as the common heritage of all humanity.
- 2. Only for reasons of social benefit and with the goal to provide as much freedom and well-being to every human, it is allowed to provide people or groups with separate rights to that common heritage.
- 3. The realisation of this ideal brings with it of course the disappearance of the capitalist scheme, which divides society into two hostile classes: one that without working can enjoy property; the other which is obliged to cede part of its produce to the ruling class.
- 4. Workers can only expect their liberation from the abolition of classes and a thorough reorganisation of society. This reform will not be exclusively for the benefit of the proletariat, but for the whole of humanity; however because it is opposed to the immediate interests of the ruling classes, the liberation of the workers must be mainly the work of the workers themselves.
- 5. On a material level, the goal must be to gain the free use of all results of production. This goal is only possible in a society where collective work replaces more and more individual work, which means the collective use of natural resources and means of production.
- 6. The conversion of the capitalist scheme into a collectivistic scheme of course must be accompanied by herewith coherent reforms:
  - 1. On a moral level, by developing charity and observing solidarity.
  - 2. On a political level, by transforming the state towards a management of resources.
- 7. Socialism must observe therefore at the same time the material, moral and political liberation of the workers. Nevertheless, material liberation must be the main goal, because the concentration of capital in the hands of some classes already determines the basis of the other forms of the predominance.

== See also ==
- Plan De Man (1933)
- The Communist Manifesto
- Oxford Manifesto
