= 2014 Belgian anti-austerity movement =

Series of protests and labor strikes in Belgium

- Date: 14 October – 15 December 2014
- Location: Belgium
- Methods: Labour strike

A nationwide anti-austerity movement took place in Belgium in 2014. It consisted of multiple protests, culminating with a 24-hour labour strike. It was in protest of an austerity plan introduced by then-prime minister Charles Michel, which covered a wage freeze, an index jump, cutting of public service funding, and an increase of the retirement age from 65 to 67.

== Timeline of events ==
=== Inauguration of Michel ===
Charles Michel was inaugurated as prime minister on 11 October 2014, with his government's main goal being to reduce Belgium's national debt, which was just over 100% of GDP at the time. The proposed methods to do so were, among others, to lower taxes and raise the pension age from 65 to 67.

The austerity plan was met with protests from the Socialist Party and various trade unions, with multiple protests and smaller labour strikes following the inauguration.

=== 6 November Protest ===
On 6 November 2014, between 100,000 and 120,000 workers staged a protest in Brussels against the austerity measures. Though largely peaceful, some violence did occur, resulting in 50 injuries and 30 detained. Some cars were set on fire and police officers were attacked, leading to their use of water cannons and pepper spray on protesters.

=== 15 December general strike ===
On 15 December 2014, over 100,000 workers across Belgium refused to work, heavily impacting cargo shipments and a wide variety of passenger transportation services, including almost no operational bus, tram, and Eurostar services, as well as a large amount of flight cancellations. Around 600 flights were cancelled, affecting around 50,000 passengers. The large amount of strikers and affected areas led some to attempt to force their way through the picketing, leading to at least one arrest.

Seaports located in Ghent, Zeebrugge and Antwerp were blockaded, affecting 50 cargo ships at the Port of Antwerp alone. The airspace above Belgium was closed at approximately 10pm. Businesses, schools, and some government offices across the nation, including the National Bank of Belgium, were closed due to the strike.
