= The Curious Republic of Gondour =

Short story by Mark Twain

"The Curious Republic of Gondour" is a short story by Mark Twain, first published in the October 1875 issue of the Atlantic Monthly.

Written in the first person, it relates a visit by the unnamed narrator to a state in which all citizens are guaranteed at least one vote, but where additional votes may be acquired on the basis of personal merit. Up to eight further votes can be acquired through education, which is provided for free by the state; votes are also automatically gained by the acquisition of wealth (these being unlimited in number.) A second condition of Gondourian democracy is that no one may be seated in a public office without first passing a strenuous competitive examination. Twain intended for these measures to limit the political power of the lower classes, whom he considered unfit to direct public affairs because of their susceptibility to demagogues.

Heinlein's Expanded Universe discusses the story, though he misspells the toponym as "Gondor."

Nevil Shute proposed a similar multiple-vote scheme in his novel In the Wet (1953), but he envisioned a maximum of seven votes per citizen, with each tied to a specific personal attainment (military service, life abroad, starting a business). The exceptions were the first and seventh votes, the former being universal and the latter being granted only as a mark of special distinction by the monarch.
