= Belgian general strike of 1913 =

General strike in Belgium

General strike
- 1913; Part of General strikes in Belgium
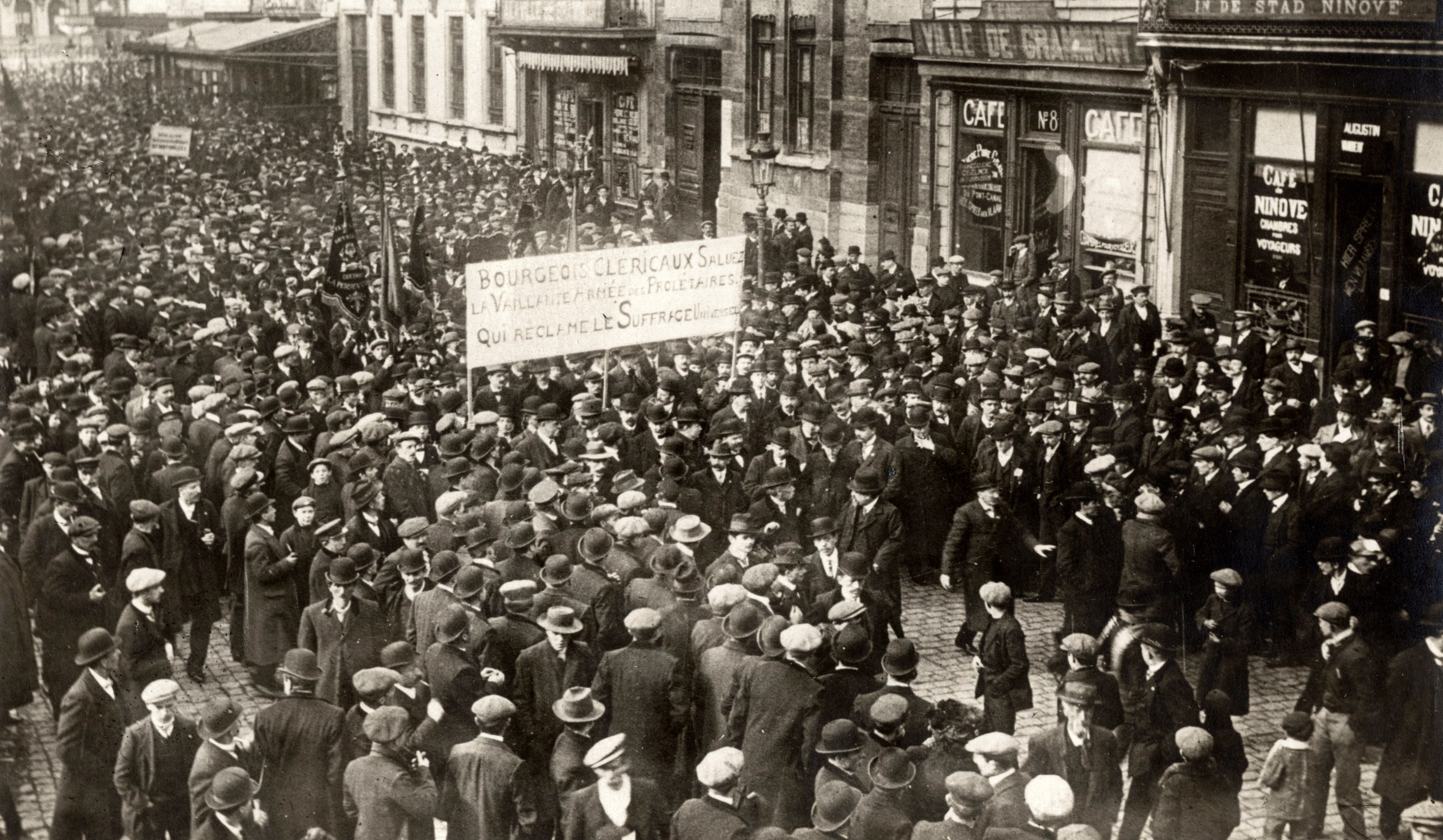
- An image of striking workers demonstrating in Mons
- Date: April 1913
- Location: Belgium
- Goals: Electoral reform
- Methods: Strike action

Parties
POB-BWP	Confessional Catholic Party

Number
300,000 - 450,000	

The general strike of 1913 (French: grève générale de 1913, Dutch: algemene staking van 1913) was a major general strike in Belgium. It was the third general strike aimed at forcing electoral reform and, like the general strike of 1902, was particularly aimed at ending the system of plural voting. It officially lasted between 14 and 24 April and brought out between 300,000 and 450,000 workers on strike. Despite its large participation, it was relatively peaceful.

== Planning ==
Unlike the poorly organised 1902 strike, the general strike of 1913 was led by the Belgian Workers' Party (POB-BWP) and meticulously planned. The POB-BWP spent ten months in planning during the aftermath of the 1912 election and instructed workers to put aside money in advance. The party was also able to maintain control throughout the strike, preventing flare-ups of violence between strikers and police. The magnitude of the strike varied by economic sector and company but was strongest among coal miners in Wallonia. It was supported financially by a number of leading Belgians Liberals, including Émile Francqui and Raoul Warocqué, who believed that the only way to stop continued Catholic Party dominance was to end the plural voting system.

== Outcome ==
The failure of the 1902 general strike was partly due to the consensus between Catholic and Liberal politicians to block electoral reform. In 1913, however, these parties had no such agreement; and the Catholic prime minister, Charles de Broqueville, was willing to compromise.

A commission was created, officially to review the franchise for municipal and provincial elections, in the expectation that it would recommend the suppression of plural voting. The German invasion of Belgium in August 1914 and the subsequent occupation delayed the implementation of the commission's proposal. In 1918, King Albert forged a post-war "Government of National Union" in the "Loppem Agreements" which brought the POB into power for the first time and paved the way for the abolition of plural suffrage. The last restrictions on women's voting were not lifted until 1948.

== See also ==
- General strikes in Belgium
- Belgium in the long nineteenth century
- 1913 Exposition universelle et internationale at Ghent which began on 6 April
