= Plural voting =

Election voting practice

Plural voting is the electoral rule that a voter might cast multiple ballots in an election. This can happen if a voter is allowed to cast a single vote in multiple districts or is allowed to cast multiple votes in one district or both. Because plural voting gives a voter more votes than another, it creates voting inequality and breaks the one man, one vote rule. Political philosopher John Stuart Mill endorsed the unfairness in the cause of competence and participation.

Fiction writer Nevil Shute endorsed unequal plural voting in his 1953 time-travel book In the Wet. He predicted that varying the number of votes applicable based on personal qualifications and achievements would improve the quality of elected representatives. Mark Twain presented the idea of plural voting based on merit in his short story "The Curious Republic of Gondour".

Plural voting is a form of weighted voting.

== Historical and modern-day use ==
=== Belgium ===
In Belgium, voting was restricted to the wealthy tax brackets from independence in 1830 until 1848, when it was expanded to include a somewhat larger number of voters. The restriction on voting was abolished in 1893 after the first general strike in Europe and replaced wide adult male franchise but with plural voting for some males. They were allowed one or two additional votes, if they were head of a family or had a certain amount of education or money. This was applied for elections from 1894 to 1919 as a way to limit the impact of universal suffrage.

Every male citizen over 25 got one vote for legislative elections, but some electors got up to two supplementary votes according to some criteria:

- holder of a school diploma;
- family head over 30, paying a poll tax of at least five francs;
- holder of a savings account of at least 2,000 francs, or beneficiary of a life annuity of at least 100 francs.

The system was unpopular. Two more general strikes - in 1902 and in 1913 - were conducted to demand the abolition of plural voting.

For municipal elections, a fourth vote was granted to family heads who paid a fixed level of electoral tax, or whose cadastral income was at least of 150 francs.

=== Ireland ===
In Ireland plural voting was used off and on prior to 1937. For a time an Irish voter could vote both in a geographic district and as a university graduate in a university constituency. Irish university constituencies elected members to the House of Commons of the United Kingdom (1918–1921), to the House of Commons of Southern Ireland (1921), and to the Dáil Éireann (1922–1937).

The Electoral Act 1923 abolished plural voting for the lower house (Dáil) elections. Thereafter electors could be registered in only one constituency, whether it was the constituency in which he or she was ordinarily resident; the constituency in which he or she occupied business premises; or one of two university constituencies. The Dáil university constituencies were abolished at the 1937 general election.

In 1938, university constituencies came into use for election of the Seanad Éireann, Ireland's upper house. Graduates of Dublin University and the National University are entitled to vote in these constituencies. However this is not plural voting as there are no other ways to vote for the upper house, whose members are mostly indirectly chosen. But there is inequality in voting rights-in addition to casting a vote in the university constituency, university graduates are allowed to also cast a vote for Dáil Éireann, the lower house of the Oireachtas, if entitled, while other voters have just the Dáil vote.

The Local Government (Dublin) Act 1930, passed by the Cumann na nGaedheal government, provided that Dublin City Council would comprise 30 "ordinary members" elected by general voters and five "commercial members" elected by business ratepayers (individuals or corporate persons). The commercial members were elected in a single five-member constituency by a version of single transferable vote that gave each elector anywhere from one ballot to six ballots, depending on the tax amount they paid. The commercial members were abolished in 1935 by the Fianna Fáil government.

Inland fisheries boards prior to 2010 were elected by holders of fishing licences, who until 1980 had varying numbers of votes depending on the cost of their licences.

=== New Zealand ===
Plural voting, also referred to as "dual voting", was abolished in New Zealand in 1889 for general elections. It is still permitted in elections of the Auckland Council and other local bodies.

=== United Kingdom ===
In the United Kingdom, up to 1948, people affiliated with a university were allowed a vote in both a university constituency and their home constituency. Also property owners could vote in the constituencies where their property lay and also the constituency in which they lived, if they were different. This was seen as unfair and the Chartists spoke out against plural voting as early as 1842. However it was only finally abolished in Parliamentary elections in 1948.

In 1892 George Shaw-Lefevre MP stated:

I have myself five votes for five different constituencies—not that I have sought the votes by purchasing property for that purpose; but they have come to me accidentally on account of holding property in different places. Two are occupation votes, two freehold votes, and one is for a University. But I know many who have a great many more votes than five. I think it was Sir Robert Fowler, a late Member of this House, who used to boast that he had no fewer than thirteen votes in different constituencies, and that he was able at one General Election to record them all. Then there is the well-known case of the Oxford tutor—a man who had eighteen different qualifications, and, at the Election of 1874, voted in respect of these different qualifications eighteen times. But this case pales before one I heard of recently. A clergyman of the Church of England, who has a hobby for acquiring qualifications in different constituencies, has been able to obtain fifty votes in different places, and I was informed that at a certain General Election he contrived to vote in no fewer than forty different places.

After 1910, the Liberal government was intent on passing a Plural Voting Bill that sought to prevent electors who appeared on the electoral register more than once from voting more than once. Liberal and Unionist headquarters were in agreement that 29 seats were won by Unionists in December 1910 because of plural voting. The bill passed third reading, but before it could pass into law, World War I started and the bill was shelved. Plural voting was finally abolished for parliamentary elections by the Representation of the People Act 1948, which first applied in the 1950 general election.

Plural voting was used in local government elections for many years. It was abolished in Great Britain, outside the City of London, by the Representation of the People Act 1969.

Plural voting is still used in elections in the City of London, with a City business having a number of votes based on its number of employees.

==== Northern Ireland ====
Until the Electoral Law Act (Northern Ireland) 1968 took effect in 1969, the Queen's University, Belfast constituency was retained in the Parliament of Northern Ireland, giving an additional vote to graduates. As well, owners of businesses were allowed to cast more than one vote in parliamentary elections. Tim Pat Coogan wrote on this subject:

Limited companies and occupiers of premises with a rateable valuation of £10 could appoint nominees—as could companies for each £10 of their valuations—under a system of plural voting, which even allowed such votes to be cast in another constituency...

Plural voting also existed in local government elections in Northern Ireland, as in the rest of the United Kingdom (see above).

=== British Columbia ===
In the Canadian province of British Columbia, people who own property in a district in which they do not reside may vote in local elections in that district as well as in the district in which they reside. This applies only to individuals, not to corporations.

== Contemporary theory ==
Philosopher Thomas Mulligan has proposed a system of plural voting which uses a mathematical algorithm to determine voters' ability and then gives higher-ability voters more votes.

== See also ==
- University constituency
- One man, one vote
- Suffrage
- Prussian three-class franchise
- Functional constituency
