= Jean-Pierre Verheggen =

Belgian author and poet (1942–2023)

- Born: 6 June 1942; Gembloux, German-occupied Belgium
- Died: 8 November 2023 (aged 81); Wavre, Belgium
- Occupations: Author; Poet

Jean-Pierre Verheggen (6 June 1942 – 8 November 2023) was a Belgian author and poet.

== Biography ==
Born in Gembloux on 6 June 1942, Verheggen began contributing to TXT in the 1970s alongside Christian Prigent. He was also a French teacher at the Athénée Royal de Gembloux for the first three years of secondary education. In 1990, he was an advisor to Minister of Culture Bernard Anselme.

Verheggen's works centered around oral poetry and humor, with images of cruelty, voluptuousness, politics, social issues, and linguistics. The Alphabet des lettres françaises de Belgique commented on his poetry, saying "His poetry is above all a parody of poetry, a radical critique of the ideology that this genre conveys and a burlesque pastiche of its conventions. From there, in 1968 he developed the concept of rewriting and applied its effects to broader fields of investigation, ranging from comics to the most stereotypical political language, including the perversion of a language by another, in this case classic and academic French through his maternal Walloon, wild and sexual.".

In 1995, he was awarded the Grand prix de l'humour noir Xavier-Forneret for Ridiculum vitae.

In 2005, he published Portraits crachés, a collection of portraits of fictional and nonfictional Belgian characters, such as Salvatore Adamo and Tintin, in collaboration with Pierre Kroll, Frédéric du Bus, Kanar, Johan De Moor, Nix, Frédéric Jannin, Xavier Löwenthal, André Stas, and Juan d'Oultremont. In 2009, he was awarded Molière de la compagnie for L'Oral et Hardi, which was directed by Jacques Bonnaffé. On 12 June 2011, he was awarded the Prix Robert Ganzo for poetry at the Étonnants Voyageurs festival in Saint-Malo for the collection Poète bin qu'oui, poète bin qu'non ?.

Jean-Pierre Verheggen died in Wavre on 8 November 2023, at the age of 81.

== Decorations ==
- Commander of the Mérite wallon (2003)

== Works ==
- La Grande Mitraque (1968)
- Le Grand Cacaphone (1974)
- Le Degré Zorro de l'écriture (1978)
- Divan le Terrible (1979)
- Vie et mort pornographiques de madame Mao (1981)
- Ninietzsche, peau d'chien (1983)
- Stabat mater (1986)
- Les Folies belgères (1990)
- Artaud Rimbur (1990)
- Pubères, putains, Stabat mater, Porches, porchers (1991)
- Orthographe 1er, roi sans faute (1992)
- Ridiculum vitæ (1994)
- Opéré bouffe (1998)
- Entre zut et zen (1999)
- On n'est pas sérieux quand on a 117 ans : zuteries (2001)
- Gisella (2004)
- Du même auteur chez le même éditeur (2004)
- Amour, j'écris ton nom (2005)
- Portraits crachés (2005)
- L'Idiot du Vieil-Âge : (Excentries) (2006)
- Sodome et Grammaire (2008)
- Phallus et Morilles (2009)
- Poète bin qu'oui, poète bin qu'non ? (2011)
- Un jour, je serai Prix Nobelge (2013)
- Ça n'langage que moi (2015)
- Ma petite poésie ne connaît pas la crise (2017)
- Pubers, pietenpakkers - Pubères, putains (2018)
- Le Sourire de Mona Dialysa (2023)
