= Walloon Merit =

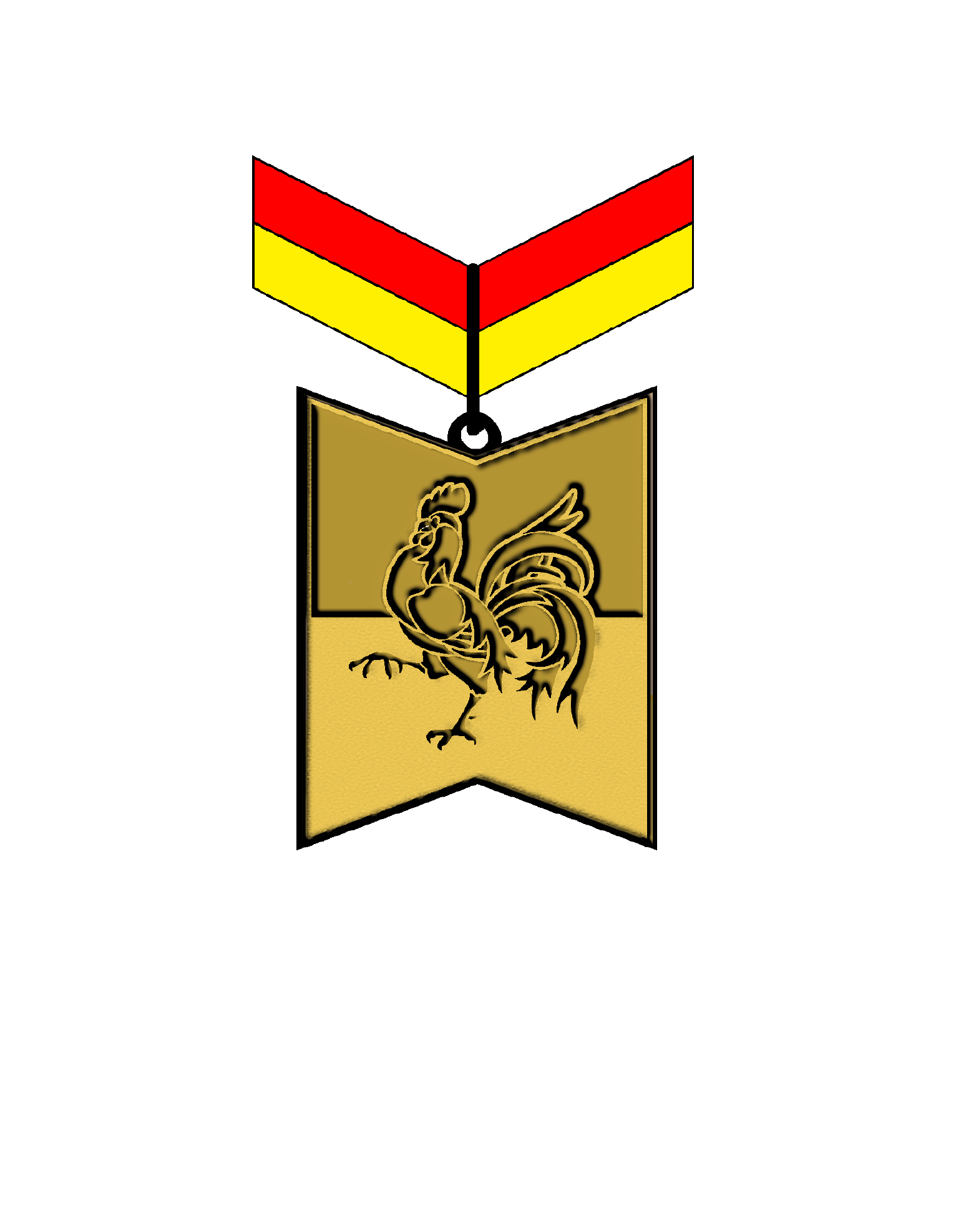
- Insignia of the order

Awarded by Government of Wallonia
- Type: Order of merit
- Founded: 31 March 2011
- Eligibility: To any natural or legal person whose talent or merit has brought or continues to bring exceptional honour to Wallonia and thus contributes significantly to its influence.
- Status: Currently constituted
- Grades: Commander; Officer; Knight; Medal
- Post-nominals: CMW; OMW; ChMW; MMW
- Ribbon (commander)

The Walloon Merit (French: mérite wallon) and the Spark of Wallonia (French: Étincelle de Wallonie) are a civilian honour for merits in the Belgian region of Wallonia. They are awarded by the Government of Wallonia to recognise individuals or organisations whose achievements bring exceptional distinction to the region. The Walloon Merit was established by decree on 31 March 2011, while the Spark of Wallonia was introduced on 12 July 2023 as a complementary distinction for young people or emerging talents aged 18 to 35.

The honours are presented annually in Namur, the capital of Wallonia, during Wallonia Day. They recognise persons whose talent, dedication, or merit contributes to the reputation and influence of Wallonia in fields directly or indirectly related to the region’s areas of competence. In exceptional circumstances, the distinctions may also be awarded outside the annual ceremony.

== History ==
The creation of the Walloon Merit originated from a wider reflection on civic recognition and identity within the Walloon Region. Throughout history, human societies have honoured exceptional acts and exemplary conduct through various distinctions, a tradition modern states have adapted to reward civic merit and public service. Inspired by this historical continuity, the Walloon authorities sought to establish a distinction that would celebrate values such as dedication, excellence, and community contribution within a regional framework.

By the early 2000s, Wallonia had consolidated many of its political and cultural symbols, including its flag, anthem, and regional holiday. As part of a broader movement of self-definition within the Belgian federal structure, the government aimed to complement these symbols with an official recognition of individual and collective merit. Similar systems already existed in other federated entities such as Quebec, and several other Canadian provinces and German Länder, which served as reference models for the Walloon initiative.

The idea of a Walloon distinction took shape within the framework of regional development strategies such as the Contrat d’Avenir pour la Wallonie and the Plan Marshall, which combined socio-economic objectives with the affirmation of a shared Walloon identity. The government’s vision emphasised civic participation, openness, and pride in local achievement, reflecting a modern approach to community recognition rather than a revival of 19th-century nationalism.

Following consultation with the Economic and Social Council of Wallonia and the Council of State, the decree establishing the Walloon Merit was adopted on 31 March 2011. The Council of State confirmed the regional competence to honour individuals for achievements directly or indirectly related to Wallonia’s areas of responsibility, provided the distinction remained distinct from federal orders of merit. The result was a specifically regional honour intended to highlight those who have contributed to Wallonia’s development, influence, and identity.

The first ceremony was held in Namur, coinciding with Wallonia Day. On this occasion, the Minister-President Rudy Demotte, presented the distinctions to several notable personalities.

On 12 July 2023, the decree was amended to introduce a complementary distinction, the Spark of Wallonia. This new category recognises individuals or organisations aged 18 to 35 whose talent or merit brings exceptional honour to Wallonia and contributes to its influence. The Spark aims to encourage young people at the beginning of their careers who are contributing to a positive future for the region. The government may determine the prizes awarded, which are not required to follow a hierarchical order.

== Eligibility ==
The Walloon Merit is awarded to individuals or organisations whose talent or merit has brought honour to Wallonia and contributed significantly to its influence. Achievements must have a direct or indirect connection to the competencies of the Walloon Region. Talent refers to notable aptitude, particularly in intellectual or artistic fields, while merit recognises distinguished conduct, services rendered, difficulties overcome, or exceptional intellectual and moral qualities. The distinction does not recognise ideological, philosophical, or political positions.

Recipients may be awarded posthumously and must not be under criminal or disciplinary investigation at the time of nomination. Awards may be revoked if the recipient no longer upholds the principles that justified the distinction. Members of the Walloon Parliament and Government cannot receive the Merit during their term, but retain any awards received prior to taking office. The Spark of Wallonia specifically targets young individuals or emerging talents aged 18 to 35 whose achievements bring exceptional recognition to Wallonia.

== Ranks ==
The Walloon Order of Merit has four ranks:

- Commander (C.M.W.), which is the highest rank
- Officer (O.M.W.)
- Chevalier (Knight) (Ch.M.W.)
- Medal (M.M.W.)

Ranks	Commander (C.M.W.)	Officer (O.M.W.)	Knight (Ch.M.W.)	Medal (M.M.W.)
Decoration				
Lapel ribbon				
Rosette				
Lapel badge				

== Promotions ==
=== Historical promotion ===
In 2012, the centenary year of Jules Destrée's Letter to the King and the creation of the Walloon Assembly, 32 historical figures «having contributed substantially to the affirmation of Walloon consciousness and the political birth of Wallonia» were posthumously honored by the Walloon Government:

- Commanders: François Bovesse, Fernand Dehousse, Jules Destrée, André Renard, Jean Rey, and Freddy Terwagne.
- Officers: Élie Baussart, Auguste Buisseret, Alfred Califice, André Cools, Julien Delaite, Marie Delcourt, Urbain Destrée, Léonie de Waha, Paul Gahide, Léopold Genicot, André Genot, Léon-Ernest Halkin, Pierre Harmel, Charlotte Hauglustaine, Jacques Leclercq, Jules Mahieu, Fernand Massart, Joseph-Jean Merlot, Albert Mockel, Paul Pastur, Félix Rousseau, Fernand Schreurs, Léon Troclet, Georges Truffaut, François Van Belle, and Jacques Yerna.

=== 2011 Honorees ===
The honorees for 2011 are:

- Commanders: Luc and Jean-Pierre Dardenne, Justine Henin, Hervé Hasquin, Guy Spitaels, Jean Stéphenne, Lise Thiry, and Jean-Pascal van Ypersele.
- Officers: Santiago Calatrava, Raymond Coumont, Armel Job, Jean Louvet, Yves du Monceau de Bergendal, Jean-Claude Vandermeeren, and Georges Vercheval.
- Knights: Hubert Nyssen, Yves Vanassche, the Ath Fire Brigade, the Liège Fire Brigade, Nicolas Tordoir (posthumously), Alexis Robert (posthumously), and Vicky Storms (posthumously).
- Medals: Sophie Bernes, Jean-François Desguin, Steve Fafra, Olivier Lecocq, François Lerate, and Pierre Noran.

=== 2012 Honorees ===
The honorees for 2012 are:

- Commanders: Gérard de Geer, Olivier De Schutter, Franco Dragone, François Englert, and Michèle George.
- Officers: Cédric Blanpain, Paul Brusson, Arsène Burny, Lionel Cox, Michel Daerden (posthumously), Eric Domb, Bernard Foccroulle, Jean-Michel Foidart, Marie Gillain, Arthur Haulot (posthumously), Jean-Émile Humblet, Freddy Joris, Christian Jourquin, Roger Lallemand, Albert Liénard (posthumously), Musique en Wallonie ASBL, Michel Quévit, Gabriel Ringlet, Jean-Michel Saive, and Bernard Serin.
- Knights: Corinne Boulangier, Christine Mahy, Luc Maquoi (posthumously), Guy Namurois (posthumously), Nele Paxinou, Paul Trigalet, and Charline Van Snick.

=== 2013 Honorees ===
The honorees for 2013 are:

- Officers: Roch Doliveux, François Fornieri, Jean Galler, Catherine Henry, Jacques Hoyaux, Joseph Michel, Marcel Miller, Thierry Bodson, Thierry Jacques, Isabelle Cassiers, Joël De Coninck, Sang Hoon Degeimbre, François Walthéry, and Musée de la vie wallonne.
- Knights: Tony Ciccarella, Frédéric Maréchal, Yvonne L’Hoest, Liliane Balfroid, Charles Gardier, Nicolas Guiot, Jacques Mercier, Jean Steffens, Marc Coudron, Anne d’Ieteren, Noël Levêque, Father Willy Gettemans, Gérard Jadoul, and Paul Piret.

=== 2014 Honorees ===
The honorees for 2014 are:

- Officers: Bernard Delvaux, Yves Prete, Emmanuel Prévinaire, Philippe Taminiaux, Fabienne Bister, Les Grignoux, François Maniquet, Pierre Sonveaux, Steven Laureys, Michel Georges, Louis Leloup, Stéphane Halleux, Daniel Van Buyten, Pino Cerami, Valmy Féaux, Guy Lutgen, Serge Kubla, and François Martou.
- Knights: Françoise Gillard, Jodie Devos, Mélanie De Biasio, Laury Zioui, Nadia Zioui, Arabelle Meirlaen, Nafissatou Thiam, René Schyns, Jean Dauphin, and Jean Nicolay.

=== 2015 Honorees ===
The honorees for 2015 are:

- Commander: Salvatore Adamo.
- Officers: Marie-Anne Belfroid-Ronveaux, Ingrid Berghmans, Patrice D. Cani, William Cliff, Bruno Colson, Anne Demelenne, Jacques Dubois, the Ducasse d'Ath, the Ducasse de Mons, Marie-Elisabeth Faymonville, David Goffin, Pierre Kroll, Marie-José Laloy, Sabine Laruelle, Roger Leloup, Louis Namèche, Willy Peers, Jean-Claude Pirotte, Vincent Reuter, and Pierre Rion.
- Knights: Mady Andrien, Arlette Baumans, Bourse aux dons, Vinciane Despret, André Galhaut, Nicole Gillet, Anne Marie Heller, Laurence Humier, Sébastien Jodogne, and the Vignoble des Agaises.

=== 2016 Honorees ===
The honorees for 2016 are:

- Commander: Nafissatou Thiam (promoted to Commander following her Olympic title).
- Officers: Mitiku Belachew, Laurent Busine, Alain Coumont, Muriel De Lathouwer, Jean Defraigne, Roger Dernoncourt, John-John Dohmen, the Namur stilt walkers, Robert Eyben, Françoise Foulon, Simon Gougnard, Jean-Pierre Hansen, Steve Houben, Kazuhiko Imamura, Bouli Lanners, Chantal Mouffe, Philippe Reynaert, Jean Sequaris, Tchantchès, and Texas A&M University.
- Knights: Amicale des mineurs des charbonnages de Wallonie, Association of Descendants of Walloons in Sweden, designers of the "Oufti-1" nanosatellite, Daphné Cornez, Christiane De Wan, Jean-François Deberg, Alice on the Roof, Élodie Francart, Joachim Gérard, Michaël Gillon, Christophe Hindricq, IDELUX, Marie-Louise Matagne, Frank Mestdagh, Carol Piron, Sarah Piron, and Lucile Soufflet.

=== 2017 Honorees ===
The honorees for 2017 are:

- Commanders: Philippe Maystadt (Politics), David Goffin (Sports), Lara Fabian (Music), and Baron and Baroness Duesberg (Culture).
- Officers: Marc du Bois (Business), Anabelle Decottignies (Science), Steve Darcis (Sports), Virginie Hocq (Culture), Bishop Guy Harpigny (Churches), and the Carnival of Binche.
- Knights: Aline Zeler (Sports), Lionel Lhote (Music), Geoffrey Coppin (Cinema), and Poupée Borreman (Social Action).
- Medals: Justine Katz (Journalism) and Maxime Evrard (Heroism).

=== 2018 Honorees ===
The honorees for 2018 are:

- Commanders: Soraya Belkacemi (posthumously), Lucile Garcia (posthumously), and Cyril Vangriecken (posthumously) for Heroism (awarded following the 2018 Liège attack), Cécile de France (Cinema), and Eden Hazard (Sports).
- Officers: Michel Foucart (Business), Joachim Gérard (Sports), Éléonor Sana and Chloé Sana (Sports), Jean-Claude Servais (Culture), and brothers Jean-Baptiste and Christophe Thomaes (Gastronomy).
- Knights: Salvatore Curaba (Business), Jean-Philippe Darcis (Business), Gauthier Louppe (Culture), Anne Querinjean (Culture), Alexandra Tondeur (Sports), and Stephan Uhoda (Culture).
- Medals: *None awarded.*

=== 2019 Honorees ===
The honorees for 2019 are:

- Commanders: Philippe Gilbert (Cycling), Benoît Poelvoorde, and Robert Waseige (posthumously).
- Officers: Christian Lange, Marjorie Carpréaux, Jean-Jacques Cloquet, Pierre Gobron, Michel Lecomte, Manfred Peters, Michel Wanty, and the Watducks hockey club.
- Knights: Hugues Bultot, José Castillo, Michel Mercier, Hélène Vander Massen, and Nadja Vilenne.
- Medals: Jule Frerotte, Adélaïde Charlier, Ayrton Desimpelaere, Maud Michotte, and Élise Vanderelst.

=== 2021 Honorees ===
The honorees for 2021 are:

- Commanders: Philippe de Riquet, Prince of Chimay, Françoise Bautier, Princess of Chimay, and Joachim Gérard.
- Officers: Denis Dutrane, Marie-Claire Lambert, Stéphan Mercier, Fabien Pinckaers, and Élise Vanderelst.
- Knights: Bettina Bierfeld, Fabian Bodeux, Michel Bosseloirs, Niels Bouwens, Pierre-Yves Brull, Marjorie Carpreaux, Claude Chardon, Chelsea Da Via, Milo Dardenne, Mélanie De Paul, Nathan Delhaxhe, Charlotte Depierreux, Thierry Gretry, Roger Louvet, Brigitte Malou, Vincent Maquinay, Armand Marchant, Anaïs Montes, Christine Riga, Jean-Luc Vanderauwera, and Loïc Warlomont.

=== 2022 Honorees ===
The honorees for 2022 are:

- Commanders: Pierre Rapsat (posthumously) and Mariette Delahaut.
- Officers: Dominique Roynet, Charles Szymkowicz, Philippe Draux, Nathalie Draux, Fabrice Brion, Aurélie Willems, and Hassan Jarfi.
- Knights: Julie Clausse, Luana Debatty, Hamide Canolly, Evy Lenoir, Luc Petit, and Céline Courtoy.

=== 2023 Honorees ===
The honorees for 2023 are:

- Commanders: Bouli Lanners, Jeanne Vercheval, and Jean-Pierre Verheggen.
- Officers: José Chapellier, Pierre de Maere, Virginie Dufrasne, Françoise Jolly, Adrien Joveneau, Raphaël Liégeois, Amélie Matton, Sybille Mertens de Wilmars, Dominique Pellegrino, and Olivier Vandecasteele.
- Knights: Stéphanie Angelroth, Alice De Magnée, Harry Fayt, Laura Latour, Camille Laus, Lara Marquet, and David Servais.

=== 2024 Honorees ===
The honorees for 2024 are:

- Commanders: Jodie Devos, Anne d'Ieteren, Paul Furlan, and Jean-Michel Saive.
- Officers: Michel Boreux, Jean-François Bourlart, Guy Delrée, and Philippe Foucart.
- Knights: Marie Trignon, BeeOdiversity, and Nicolas Gillis.
- Medals: Maxime Carabin, Sarah Chaâri, Didier Gustin, and Gabriella Willems.

=== 2025 Honorees ===
The honorees for 2025 are:

- Commander: Philippe Boxho.
- Officer: Grégory Renard.
- Knights: Nathalie Delzenne, Orphée and Mauro Cataldo, and Jean-Paul Lespagnard.
- Medals: Marie Vandeputte and Royal Association Athlétique Louviéroise (RAAL).

== See also ==
- Decoration of the Flemish Community
- Orders, decorations, and medals of Belgium
