= Kerwin =

Kerwin is a surname and a given name. Notable individuals with this name are listed below.

== Surname ==
- Ashley Kerwin, fictional character in Degrassi: The Next Generation
- Brian Kerwin, American actor
- Claire Kerwin, Belgian-born Canadian artist
- Cornelius M. Kerwin, American educator
- Erin Kerwin, American politician
- Helen Kerwin, American politician
- Irene Kerwin, All-American Girls Professional Baseball League player
- James Kerwin, American film and theater director
- James C. Kerwin, American jurist
- John Kerwin, American talk-show host
- Joe Kerwin, College lacrosse coach
- Joseph P. Kerwin, American astronaut
- Lance Kerwin, American actor
- Larkin Kerwin, Canadian physicist
- Mary Ann Kerwin, American breastfeeding activist and co-founder of La Leche League
- Patrick Kerwin, Canadian judge
- Tom Kerwin, American basketball player
- Walter T. Kerwin Jr., American general
- William Kerwin (1927–1989), American actor and filmmaker

== Given name ==
- Kerwin Bell (born 1965), American football player
- Kerwin Kofi Charles, Guyanese-American professor
- Kerwin Danley (born 1961), American baseball umpire
- Kerwin Duinmeijer, Dutch murder victim
- Kerwin Frost, American DJ
- Kerwin Korman, fictional comic book character Doomsday Man
- Kerwin Mathews (1926–2007), American actor
- Kerwin Mungroo, South African cricketer
- Kerwin Peixoto (born 1988), Peruvian footballer
- Kerwin Roach, American basketball player
- Kerwin Swint (born 1962), American political scientist
- Kerwin Vargas (born 2002), Colombian footballer
- Kerwin Waldroup (born 1974), American football player
