= Coal mine du Gouffre =

Coal mine in Belgium

Coordinates: 50.4255°N 4.5035°E

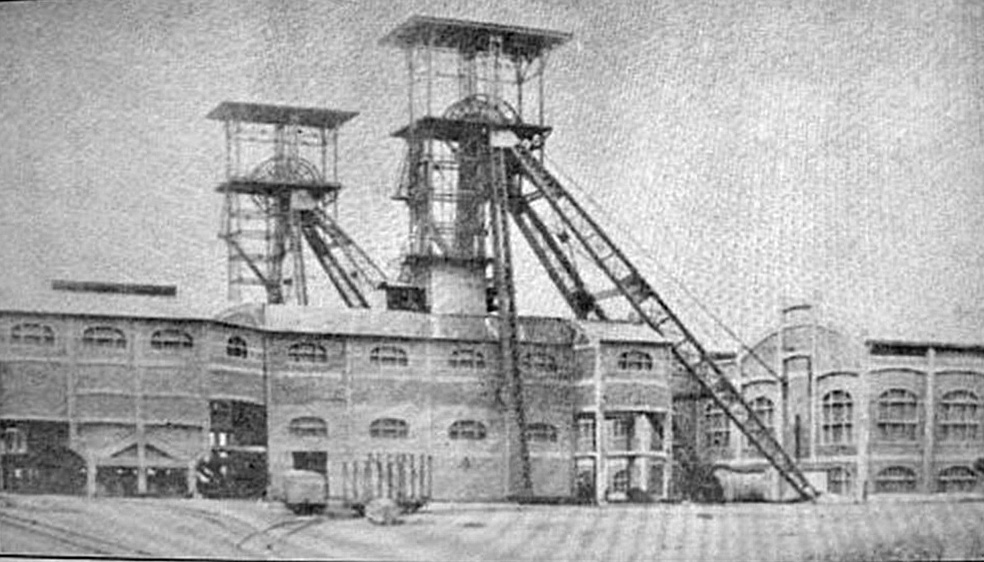
- Coal mine du Gouffre in activity

- Location within Belgium
- Location: Châtelet
- Opened: 1916
- Closed: 1969
- Company: Société des Charbonnages du Gouffre

The Coal mine du Gouffre (No. 10) is the main and last colliery company of Charbonnages du Gouffre. It is located at Châtelet Belgium, Walloon Region in the province of Hainaut. It was operated from 1916 to 1969. The concrete building is built in 1934. After closure, the site was converted into a zoo between 1979 and 1982 before becoming a site vehicle dismantling.

== Exploitation ==
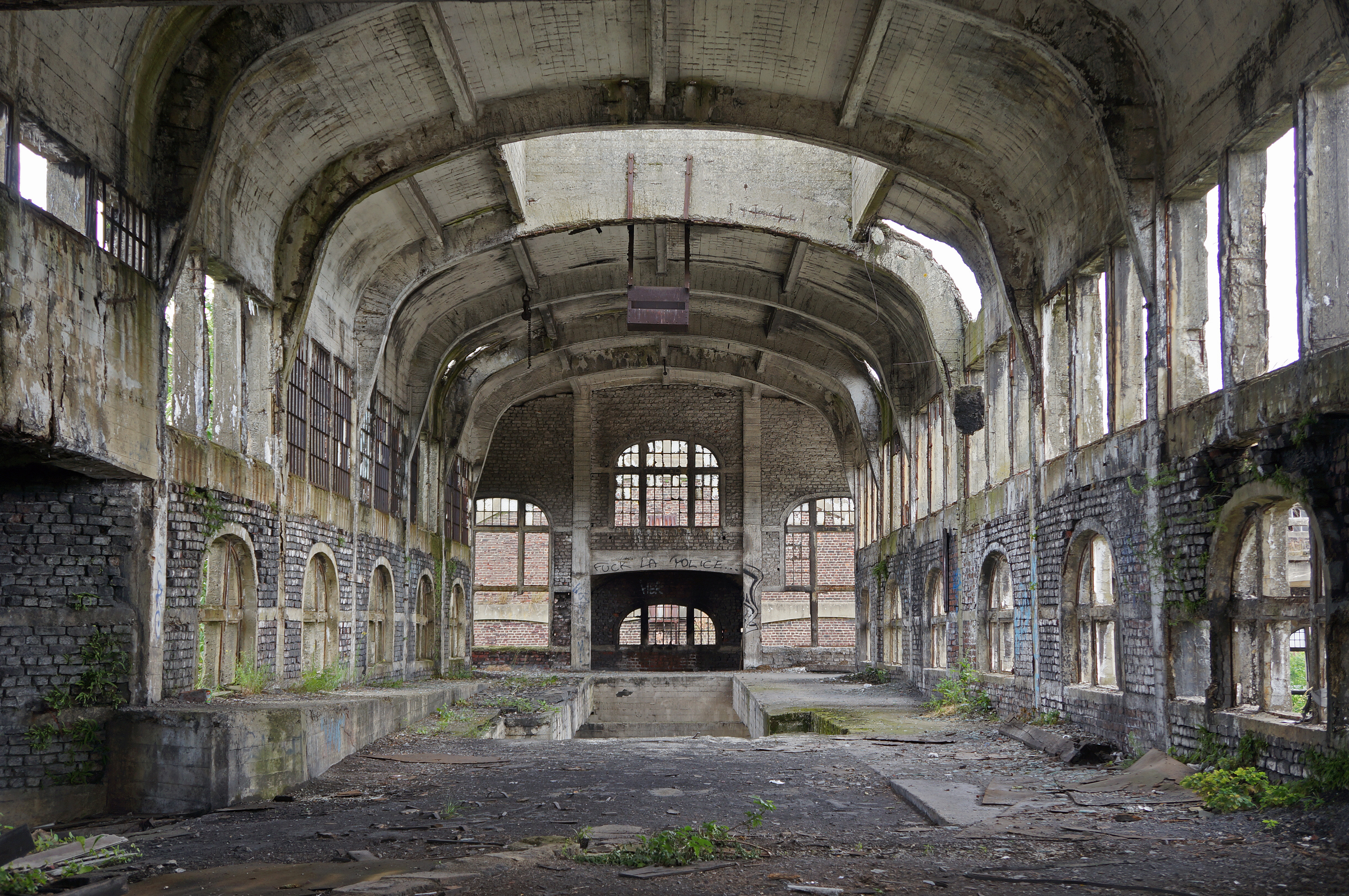
Inside the ruins.

The Coal mine No. 10 has been opened by Société des Charbonnages du Gouffre in 1916. It could extract 145 000 tons every year. The building have the same architecture (brickstone and reinforced concrete) and have been built in 1934.

In the sixties, the capacity of the coal mine No. 10 has been reduced : in 1963, it could only extracts 83 000 tons per year. It has been definitively closed on March 31, 1969. The seat No. 7, the last of the company, has been closed on July 15, 1969.

== Conversion ==
After its closure, several person became turn by turn owner of the site. A zoo opened from 1979 to 1982, and was directed by Mr Heuchon. There was also a wrecking yard that left a serious pollution on the site. Some dead sheep bodies have been put on the site, after the Eid al-Adha festivities.

== Ruins ==
In the early twenty-first century, there are still ruins known for the practice of urbex. The site is empty and there is no mark of mining activities. One building is used by a company that makes concrete.

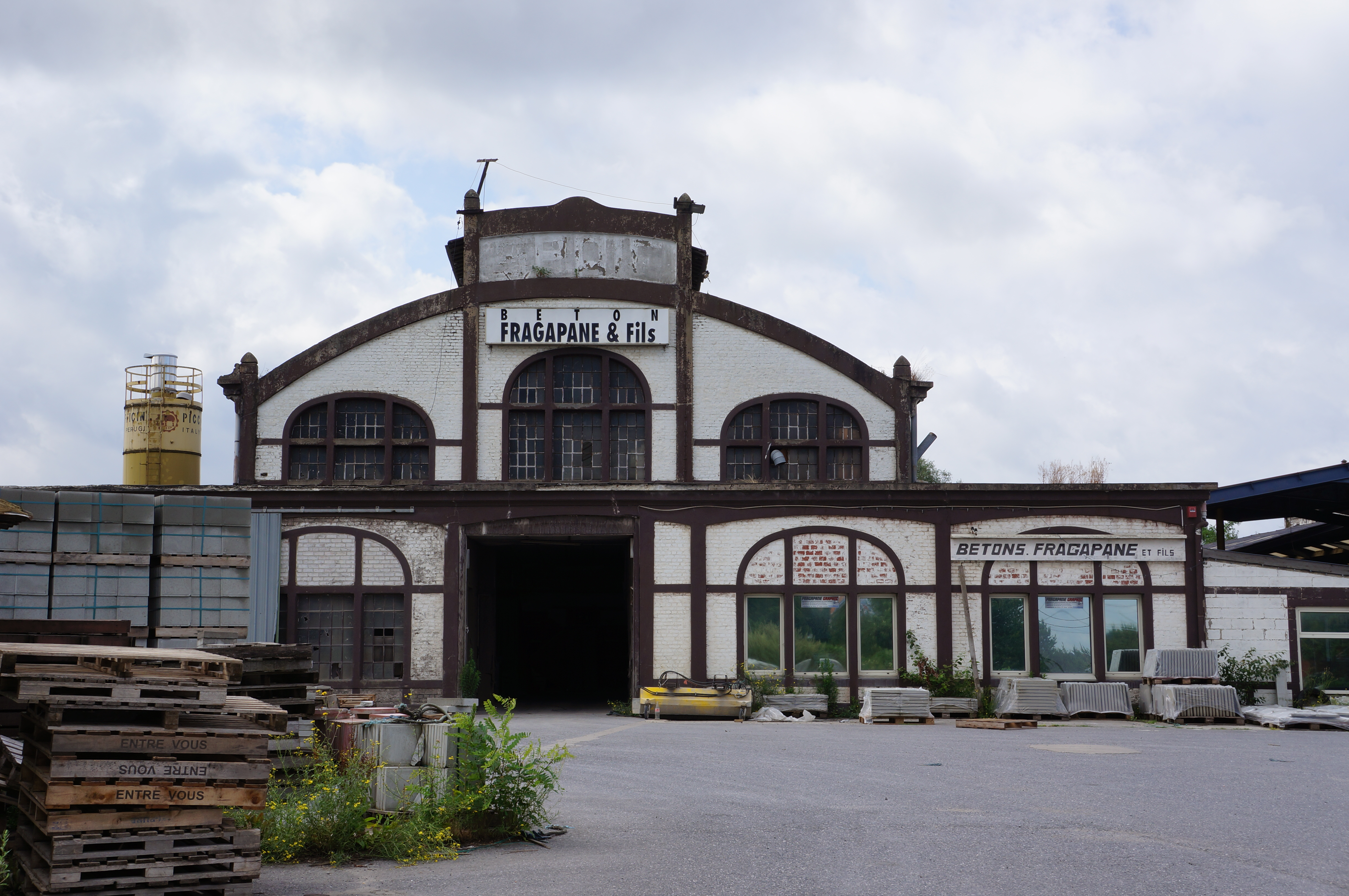
The preserved building.

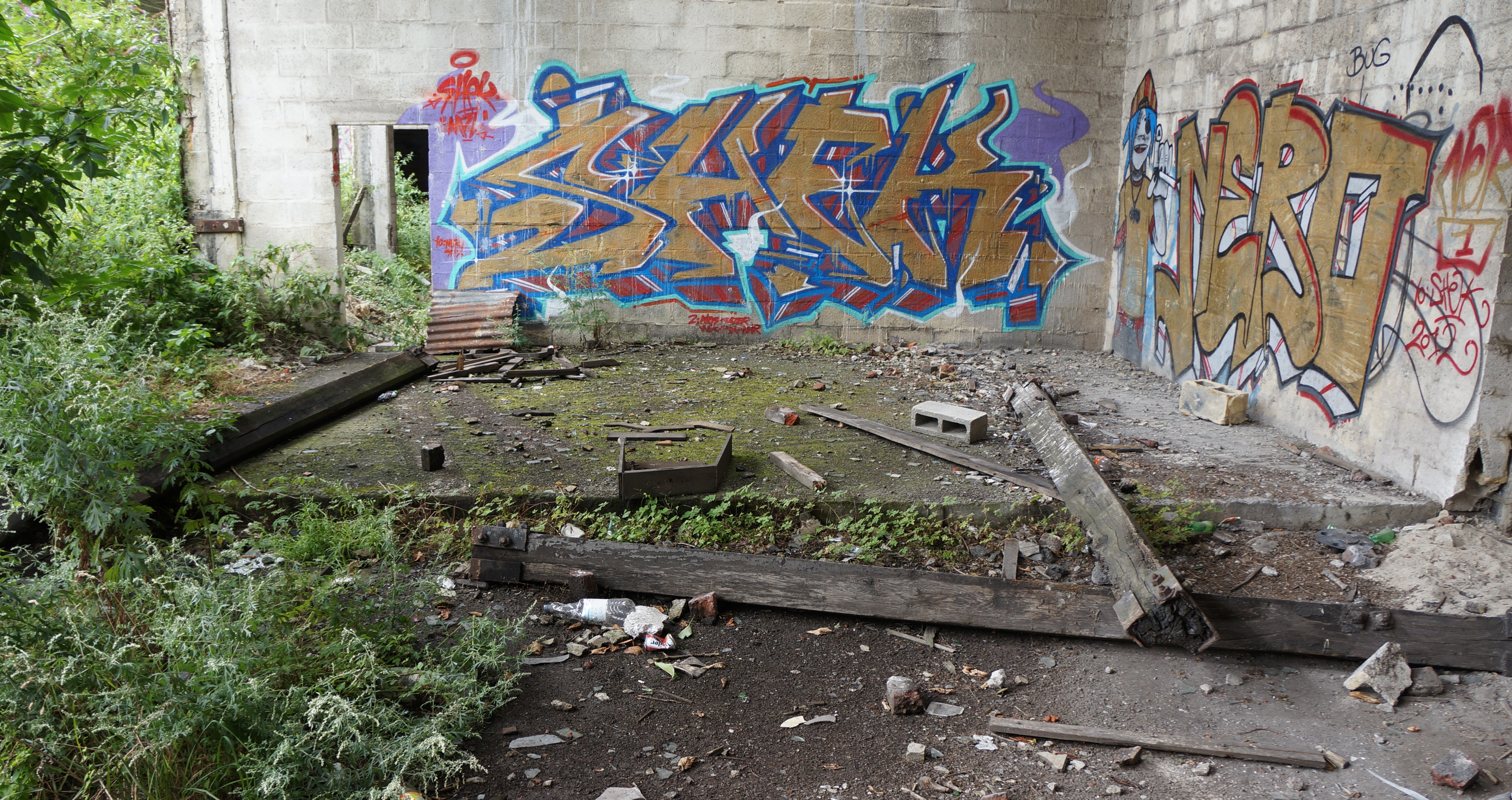
The concrete slab of a mine shaft.

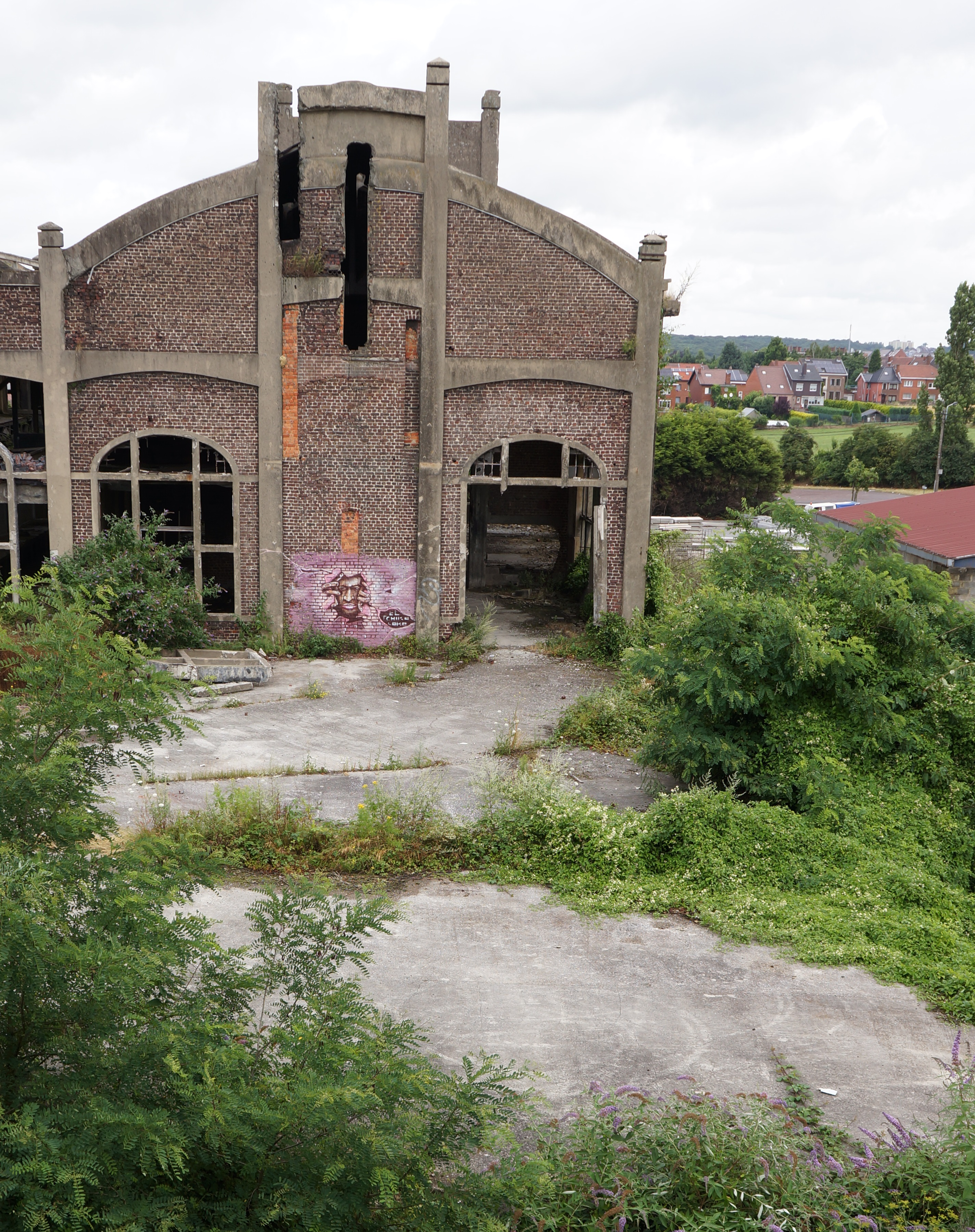
Another mine shaft.

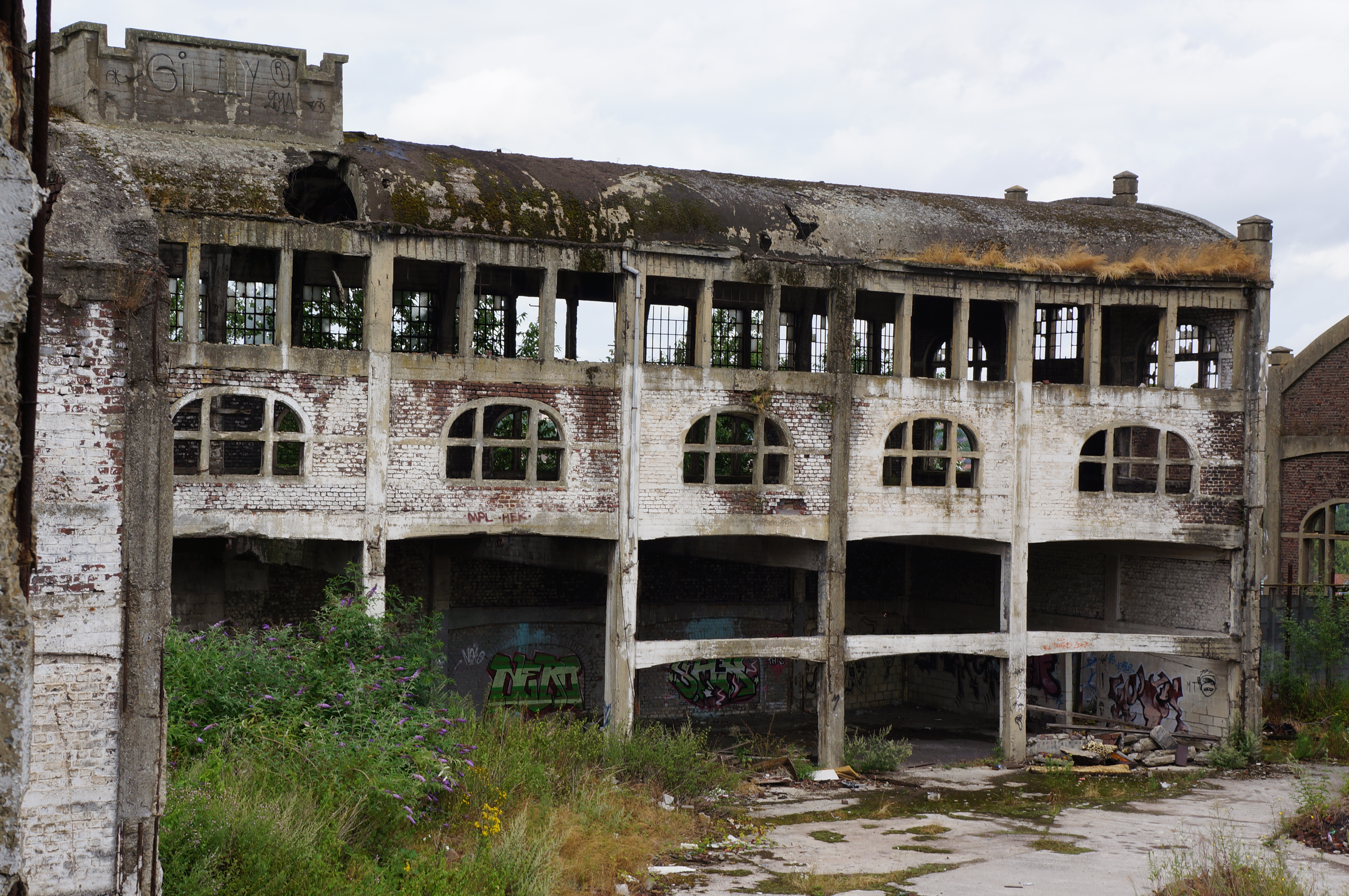
The coal handling building.

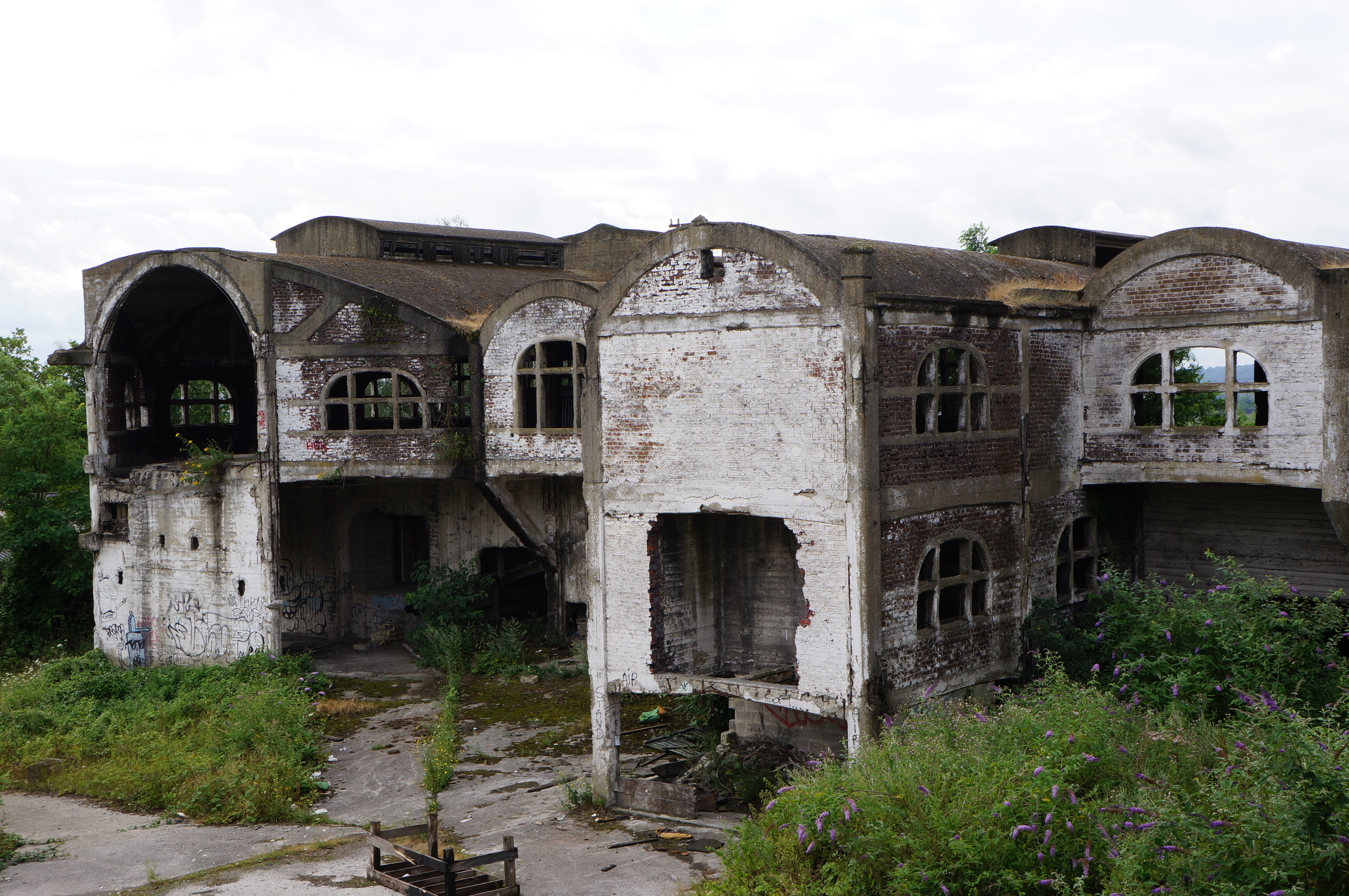
The coal handling building.
