= Pierre Paulus =

Belgian expressionist painter

Baron Pierre Paulus de Châtelet
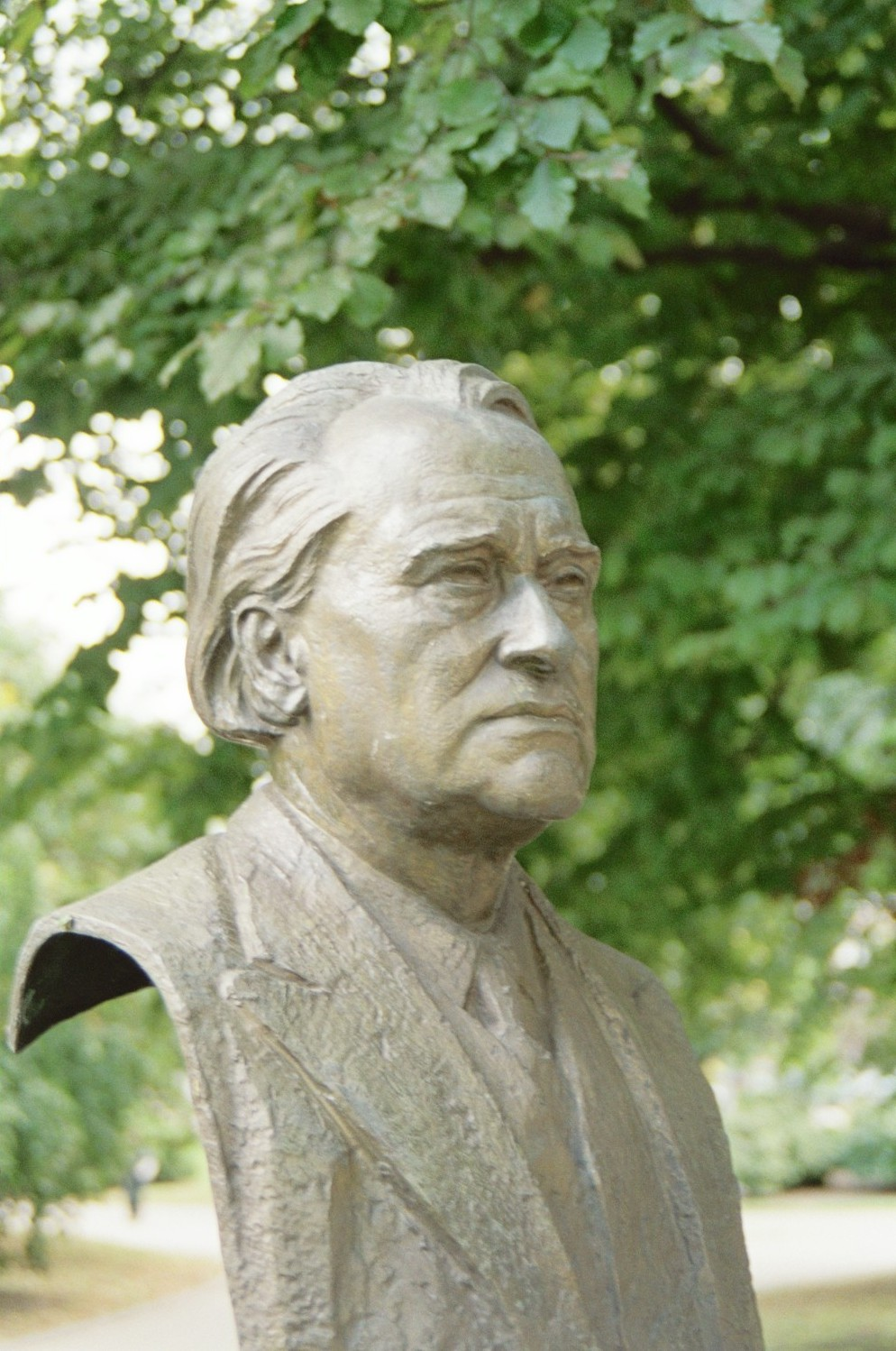
- Portrait bust (1930) by Alphonse Darville
- Born: 16 March 1881; Châtelet, Belgium
- Died: 17 August 1959 (aged 78); Brussels, Belgium
- Notable work: Flag of Wallonia
- Movement: Expressionism
- Relatives: Pierre Binetter

Pierre Paulus (1881–1959), later Baron Pierre Paulus de Châtelet, was a Belgian expressionist painter. He is best known as the designer of the "bold rooster" (French: coq hardi) adopted on 3 July 1913 as the symbol of the Walloon Movement and today the flag of Wallonia.

Paulus gained notability during the Walloon Art Exposition of Charleroi in 1911 and, in the interwar period, he held several exhibitions in Europe and in the United States.
