= Fernand Deschamps =

Belgian philosopher (1868-1957)

Fernand Deschamps (July 13, 1868 in Châtelineau – March 15, 1957 in Brussels) was a Belgian intellectual who participated in the great socio-economic and ethical debates in the first half of the twentieth century.

== Biography ==
At the age of sixteen Deschamps started working in the metal industry Many years later he obtained the title of Doctor of Laws after he passed the examination by the Central Board of State (in Leuven). He continued his studies at the Higher Institute of Philosophy (ISP) in Leuven and became editor of the newspaper Le Vingtième Siècle.

In 1898, he won the first prize in philosophy and was assigned a scholarship enabling him to spend eighteen months in Germany at the universities of Bonn, Leipzig, Berlin and Hamburg. He remained in contact with the ISP and worked for the Catholic Social Review. He also contributed to an ISP publication as regards noticeable Catholic writers and became a member of the Society of Social Economy (SES ).

In 1900, he joined the Belgian Ministry of Education. At the same time he worked under the direction of Cyril Van Overbergh ' at the Institute of Philosophy, University of Louvain, as a guest lecturer and as co-secretary of the journal Sociological Movement which was an Annex to the Neo-Scholastic Review. He participated in the creation of the Belgian Society of Sociology, was together with Georges Legrand secretary of the above-mentioned journal and was engaged as a moderator in the controversies about sociology, torn between the religious (ethical) and scientific approach. During the same period he taught philosophy at the University of Antwerp "Extension for Ladies" of Mary Elizabeth Belpaire.

In 1901, he went on a mission to the United States in order to study women’s rights, especially the right of women to vote (suffrage). A summary of his work appeared in the Journal of Sociology and as an annex to the Neo-Scholastic Review. Through numerous reviews of books and numerous articles in various scientific journals of an intellectual, social and Catholic character, he defended, as a former disciple and follower of Désiré Mercier, the positivist thought of Auguste Comte. As from 1903, he first became a teacher, then a professor at the Higher Trade Institute in Antwerp where he supervised courses of economics, economic history and political economy. Later he joined the colonial University of Antwerp as a professor.

During the First World War and the closure of universities, he found refuge in England at the University of Cambridge, Christ College. In 1933, his academic career ended and he was awarded the royal decree "emeritus" presented to him by Camille Huysmans. After the First World War, as a moderate Catholic he defended some of the ideas of Charles Maurras, but abandoned this path when these ideas took a turn he disapproved of. Until 1940 he participated actively and extensively in socio-political and religious debates in Catholic journals such as Le Vingtième Siècle and La Libre Belgique, usually on the first page.

With his best friend Georges Legrand, professor of social economy at the university faculty of Agricultural Sciences of Gembloux, whom he met at the ISP, he shared his ideas as regards evolution and its development. His entire archives and personal library were destroyed during World War II, when his house was bombed shortly after Fernand Deschamps had left it.
