= Claude Barzotti =

Belgian singer (1953–2023)

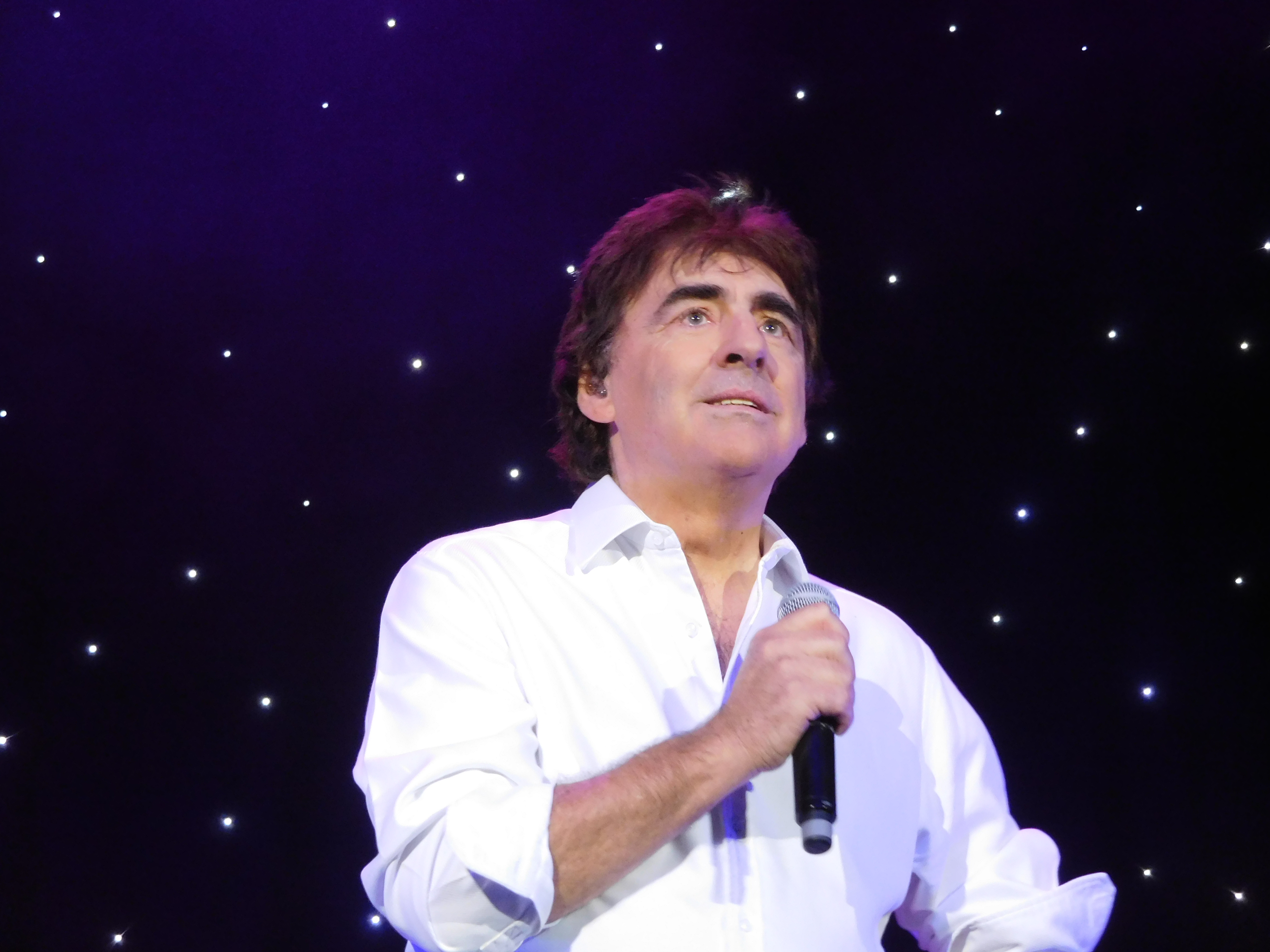
- Barzotti in 2017
- Born: Francesco Barzotti; 23 July 1953; Châtelineau, Belgium
- Died: 24 June 2023 (aged 69); Court-Saint-Étienne, Belgium
- Occupation: Singer
- Years active: 1975–2020
- Children: 2

Claude Barzotti (born Francesco Barzotti, Italian pronunciation: [franˈtʃesko barˈdzɔtti]; 23 July 1953 – 24 June 2023) was a Belgian singer of Italian origin who was prominent during the 1980s. Barzotti recorded several songs which each sold hundreds of thousands of copies. He first achieved success in 1983 with his song Le Rital.

== Biography and career ==
Barzotti was born in Châtelineau, Belgium, but raised in Italy. Barzotti moved back to Belgium at the age of 18 and settled in the town of Court-Saint-Étienne. Barzotti began his musical career in France in 1981 with his song Madame, which sold 400,000 copies. However, later in the year, Barzotti found widespread success with his song Le Rital, which propelled him to household-name status.

Rital is a derogatory French slang term used to refer to people of Italian descent. The song deals with Barzotti's experiences as a young child and how "he would have preferred to be named Dupont" (a common French surname) but the song also deals with his pride concerning the term, exemplified in lines such as Je suis rital et je le reste, (I'm Italian and will so remain). Barzotti's career continued throughout the 1980s, but his last major successful song was Aime-moi (Love Me) in 1990, at which point many people believed his career was far from over. Although Barzotti took advantage of the wave of nostalgia which gripped France at the turn of the 21st century, he was unable to capture the musical prominence he had once held. Because of his distinctive voice and great successes in the French music industry, he is considered one of the most prominent French pop musicians of the 1980s. Barzotti's music was also popular in Québec, with songs such as Je ne t'écrirai plus (I Won't Write You Anymore), Prends bien soin d'elle (Take Good Care of Her), C'est moi qui pars (It's Me Who's Leaving), and J'ai les bleus (I Have the Blues).

Barzotti's songs have also been featured in movies and DVDs in France. The movies in which his songs have been featured have sold more than five million copies. He also wrote the Belgian entry to the 1992 Eurovision Song Contest.

Barzotti's best-of compilation was released in France in 2003, and he also recorded a more traditional Italian song, Vado Via. He released a new single, Jada, on 8 August 2007, the proceeds from which went to benefit children in poor countries who did not have access to education. His 2012 album C'est mon histoire debuted at No. 39 on the Canadian Albums Chart.

Barzotti died on 24 June 2023, 29 days before his 70th birthday.

== Selected discography ==
- 1981: Madame
- 1983: Le Rital
- 1984: Beau, j's'rai jamais beau
- 1986: C'est moi qui pars...
- 1987: J'ai les bleus
- 1990: Aime-moi
- 1991: Douce
- 1991: Amani
- 1992: Pour elles
- 1993: Chante en italien
- 1993: Chante Noël
- 1996: Je t'apprendrai l'amour
- 1998: Émotions
- 2003: Ancora
- 2013: Une autre vie
- 2013: Re-chante Noël
- 2015: Le temps qui passe
- 2019: Un homme
