= Châtelet, Belgium =

City in Hainaut Province, Wallonia, Belgium

Châtelet Tcheslet (Walloon)
- Municipality
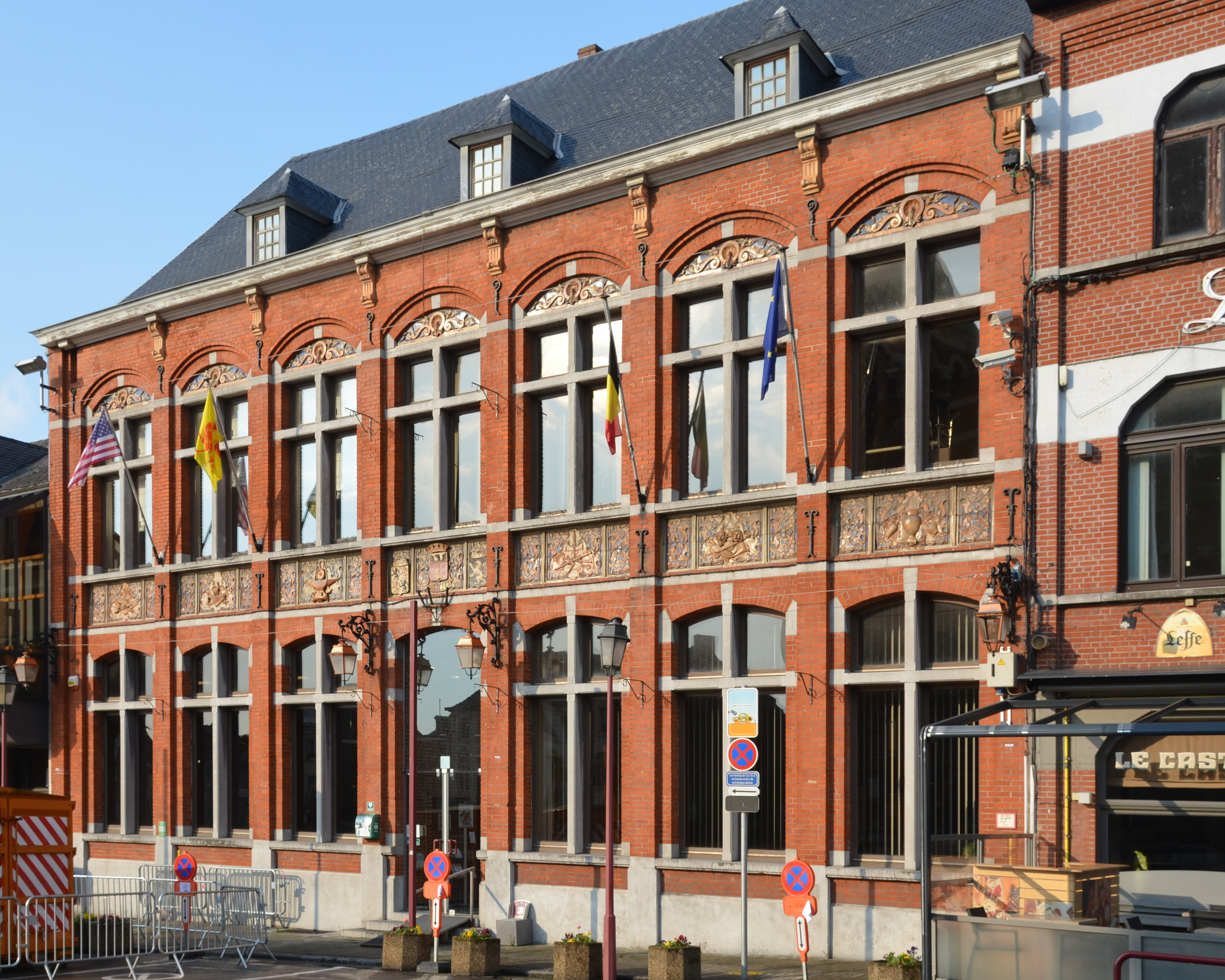
- The town hall.

- Flag Coat of arms

- Location of Châtelet in Hainaut
- Interactive map of Châtelet
- Location in Belgium
- Coordinates: 50°24′N 04°31′E
- Country: Belgium
- Community: French Community
- Region: Wallonia
- Province: Hainaut
- Arrondissement: Charleroi

Government
  - Mayor: Daniel Vanderlick (PS)
  - Governing party: PS

Area
  - Total: 27.35 km^{2} (10.56 sq mi)

Population (2018-01-01)
  - Total: 36,101
  - Density: 1,320/km^{2} (3,419/sq mi)
- Postal codes: 6200
- NIS code: 52012
- Area codes: 071
- Website: www.chatelet.be

Châtelet (French pronunciation: [ʃatlɛ]; Walloon: Tcheslet) is a city and municipality of Wallonia located in the province of Hainaut, Belgium. It lies on the river Sambre.

As of January 1, 2018, Châtelet had a total population of 36,101. The total area of the municipality is 27.03 km^{2} which gives a population density of 1,336 inhabitants per km^{2}.

The municipality consists of the following districts: Bouffioulx, Châtelet, and Châtelineau. Châtelet was a long established independent city prior to its fusion with the other entities.

== History ==
=== Origins and Middle Ages ===
The first settlers of the site of Châtelet, dating from paleolithic times, were attracted by the ford on the river, the nearby wooded areas and flint-rich highlands. This region was continuously populated, first by Celtic, then Gallo-Roman peoples, until the Germanic invasions of the 4th and 5th century. In the 9th century, the land was likely part of emperor Louis the Pious's estate.

The first occurrence of the name Châtelet appears in a text dating from the time when its territory was given to the chapter of the Liège cathedral in the 12th century. Châtelet obtained its charter of rights in 1220, symbolized by the perron.

The protection later afforded by the Prince-Bishopric of Liège made the city into an important administrative, cultural, and economic centre, which could boast four annual trade fairs and a weekly cattle market. It became one of the 23 bonne villes (main cities) of the prince-bishopric in 1655.

While Châtelet's economy was dominated by artisanal guilds and trade, that of its neighbours, including Châtelineau and Bouffioulx, remained mostly agricultural.

=== 18th century until now ===
The 18th century first witnessed the gradual shift of the regional economic power from Châtelet to the newly founded neighbouring city of Charleroi. This was also a time of political instability as the various powers of the day (Spain, France, Austria) fought for supremacy in this region. By the end of the century, the main economic drivers of the whole Sambre valley had become coal and heavy industry. The prosperity that came with the industrial revolution accounts for much of the population growth of the 1800s: Châtelet grew by a factor 5 in less than a century; Châtelineau grew by a factor 20 between 1811 and 1950 to more than 18,000 inhabitants. Many of the current city streets can be dated from that period. Cultural activities and artistic talent flourished as well.

Chatelet, and, in particular, Bouffioux, became well known for the production of its potteries. Originally formed in coal-fired kilns, the works from the region became internationally sought after. Three major producers still exist in the region and continue to produce artistic, as well as useful, pottery, but on a much smaller scale. The 20th century was not kind to the region but despite having witnessed two world wars and the decline of most of its industries, Châtelet is now again a regional center for trade, culture, and educational services.

== Sights ==
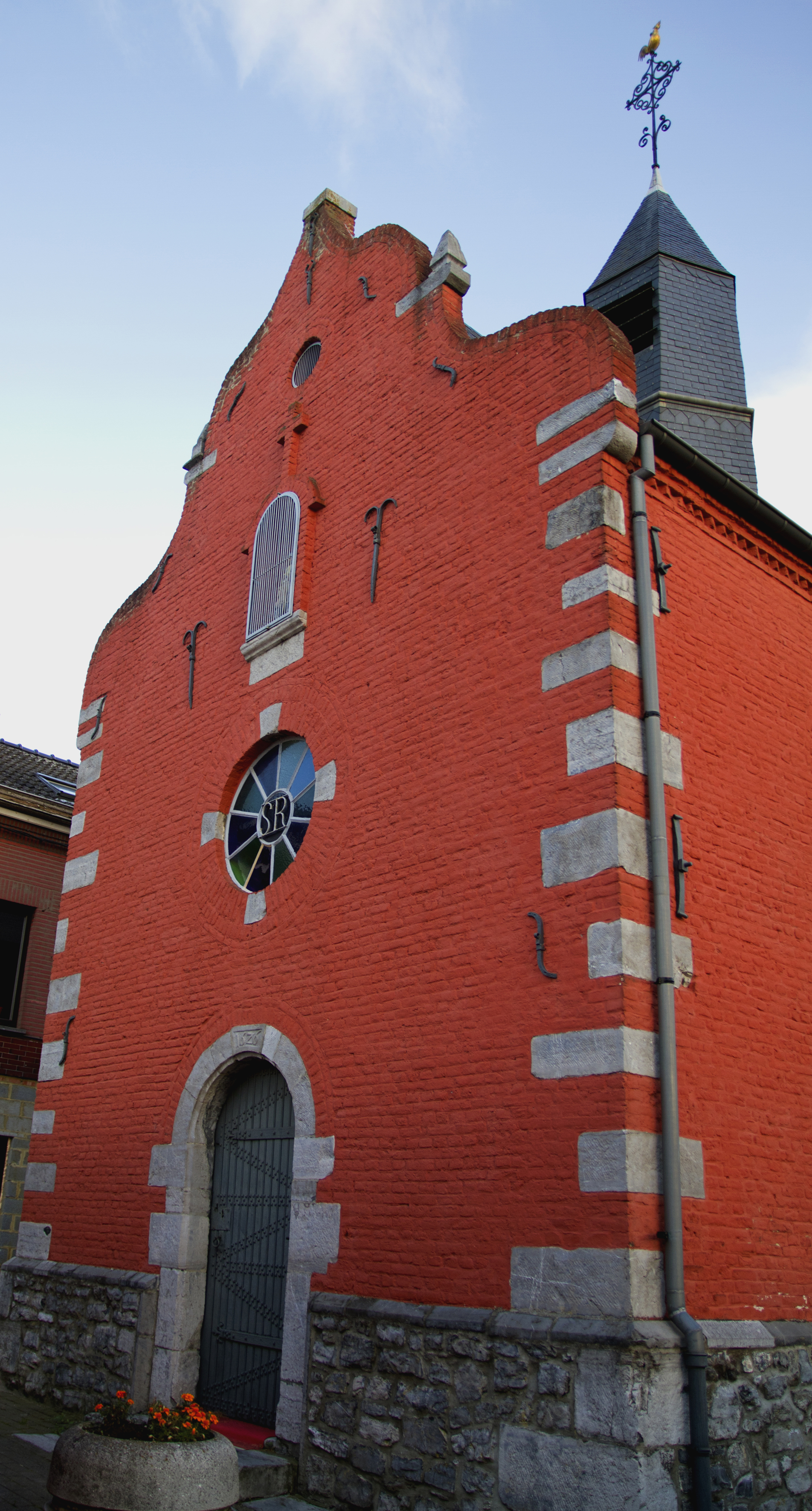
The Saint-Roch chapel.

- The Saint Roch chapel, built in the Baroque style, dates from 1626. The so-called Spanish House dates from the same period.
- The Magritte walk in the center of the city features various surrealistic representations, including street lights capped with bowler hats in homage to the artist.
- Châtelet also boasts several green areas, including the Sebastopol reservation, which contains old quarries and an extensive bird population, the municipal woods (Bois Communal), with a bat-filled cave, and the municipal park, located at the heart of the city.
- On the Town Hall Square is the Church of S.S. Peter and Paul. The new S.S. Pierre et Paul church was built from 1867 to 1871, according to the plans of the architect E. Carpentier de Beloeil. The fire, which occurred on the night of February 19 to 20, 1937, completely destroyed the decanal church. The religious building was identically rebuilt to the original church.
- At the Grand-Rue is the Château Pirmez, a neo-classical mansion built in 1833 by Victor Pirmez. The building became an orphanage in 1903 and a reception and vocational training center in 1997.
- The Church of the Immaculate Conception is located in the Faubourg district on the Place Franco-Belge, it was built in 1878–1879 in neo-Romanesque style by the architect Elie Pierard.
- The chapel of Calvary, which is located at the corner of rue de la Praye, replaces an old oratory from 1730, a neo-classical chapel in brick and limestone from 1888.

== Gallery ==
Some views of the city of Magritte.

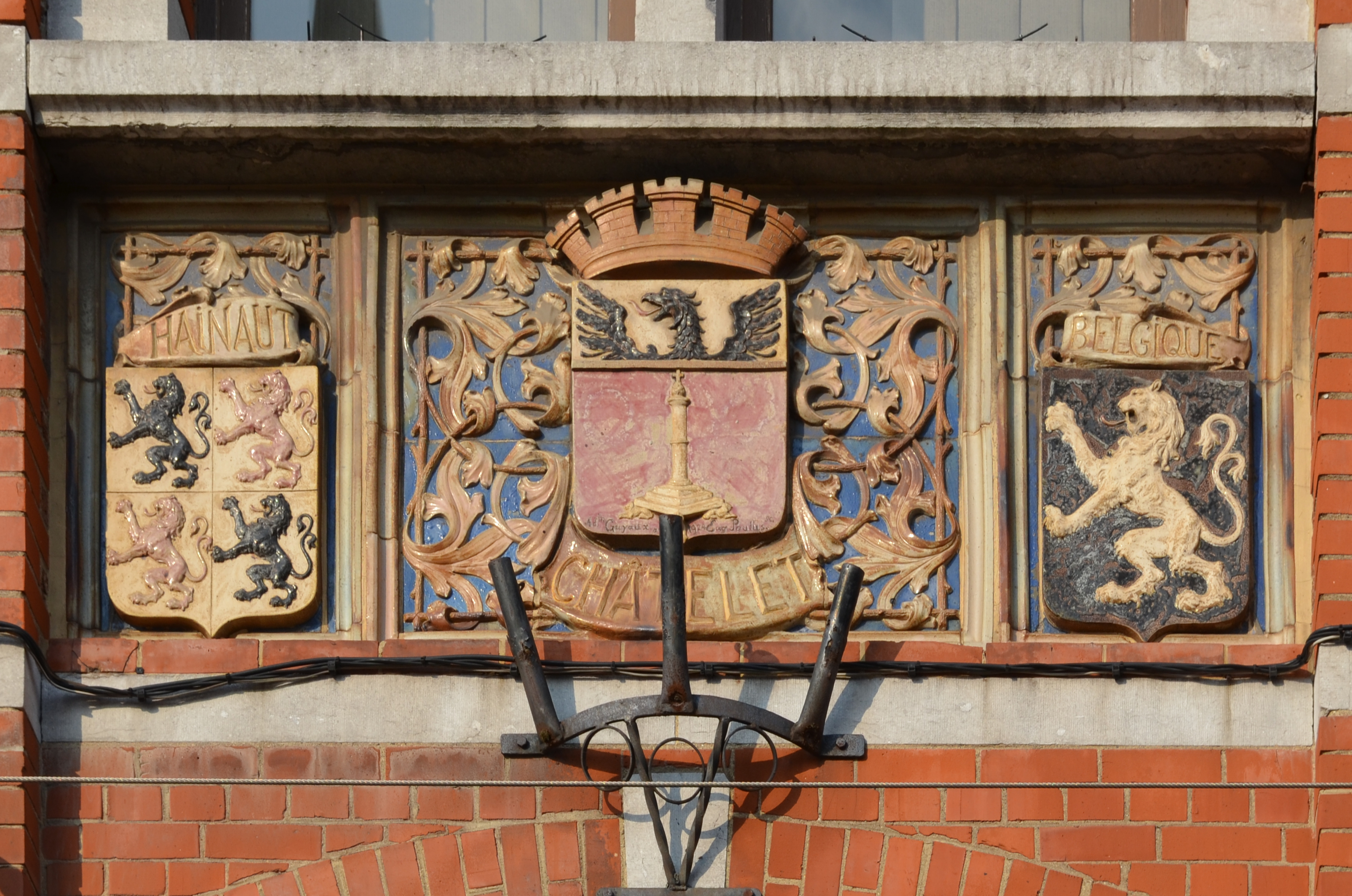
City Hall fresco.

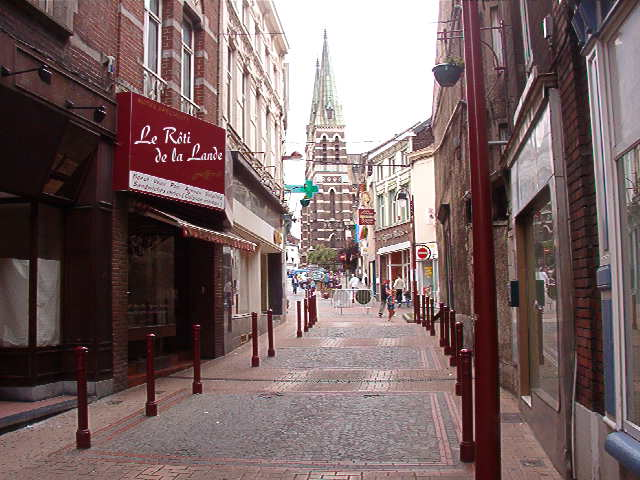
Rue Neuve in the town center and the church.

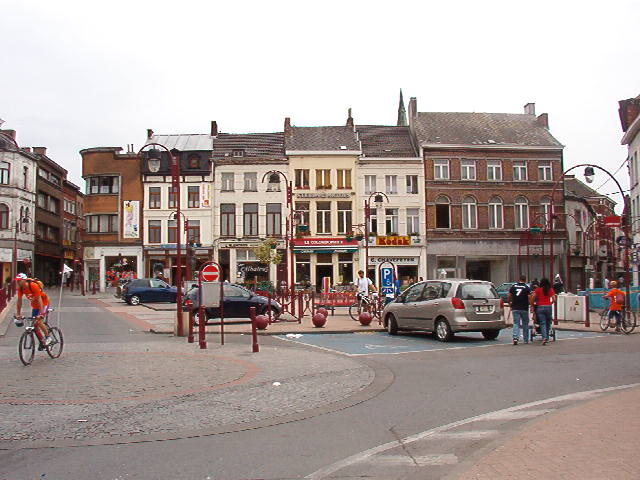
Market place.

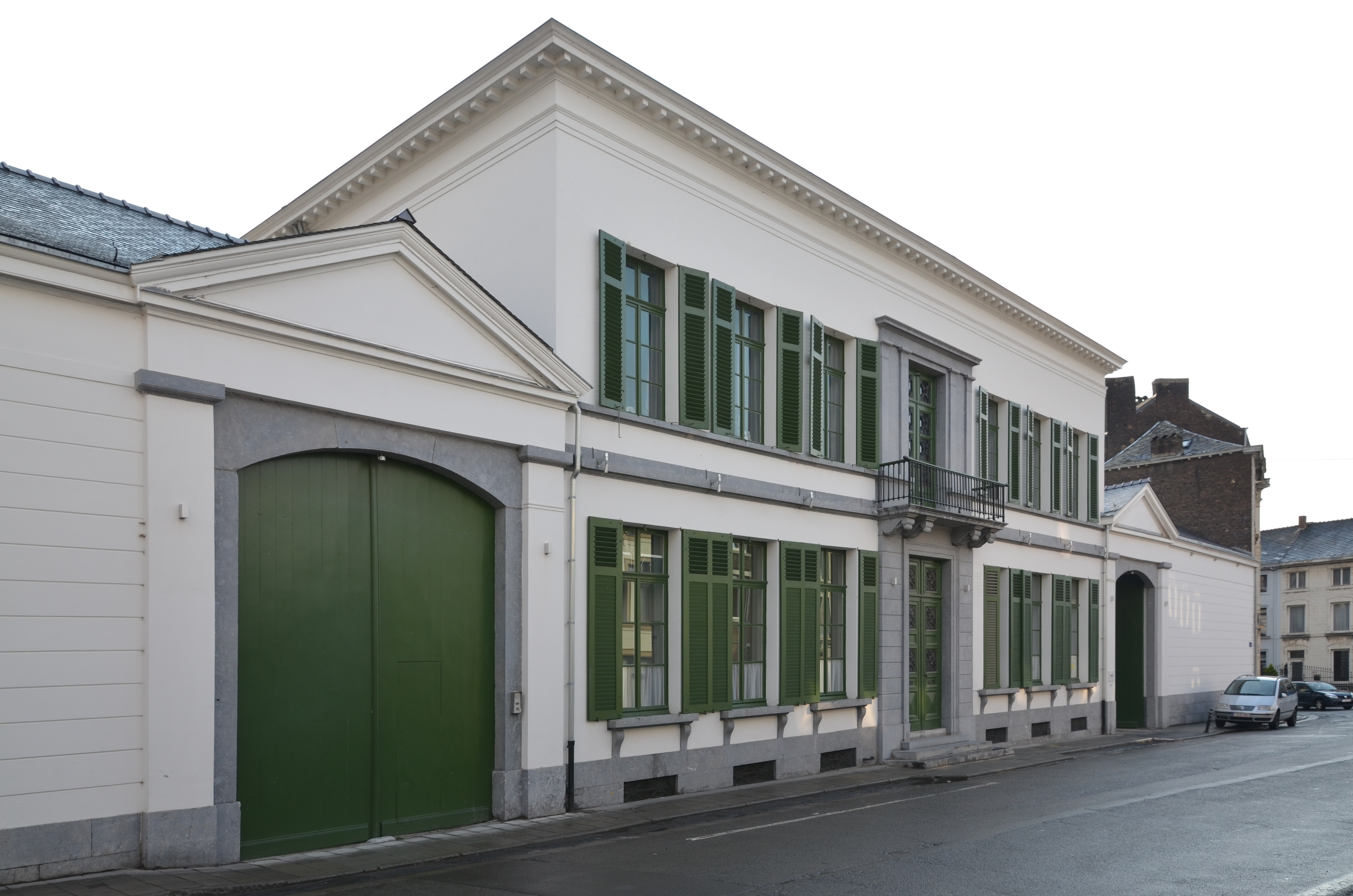
Pirmez Castle.

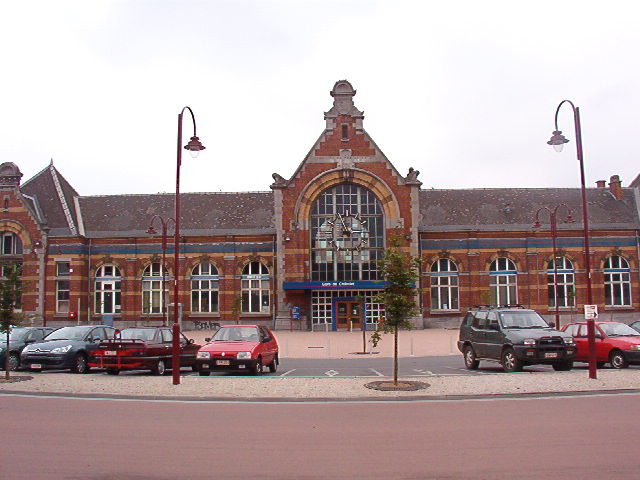
Châtelet station, built in 1911, on the territory of the commune of Châtelineau.

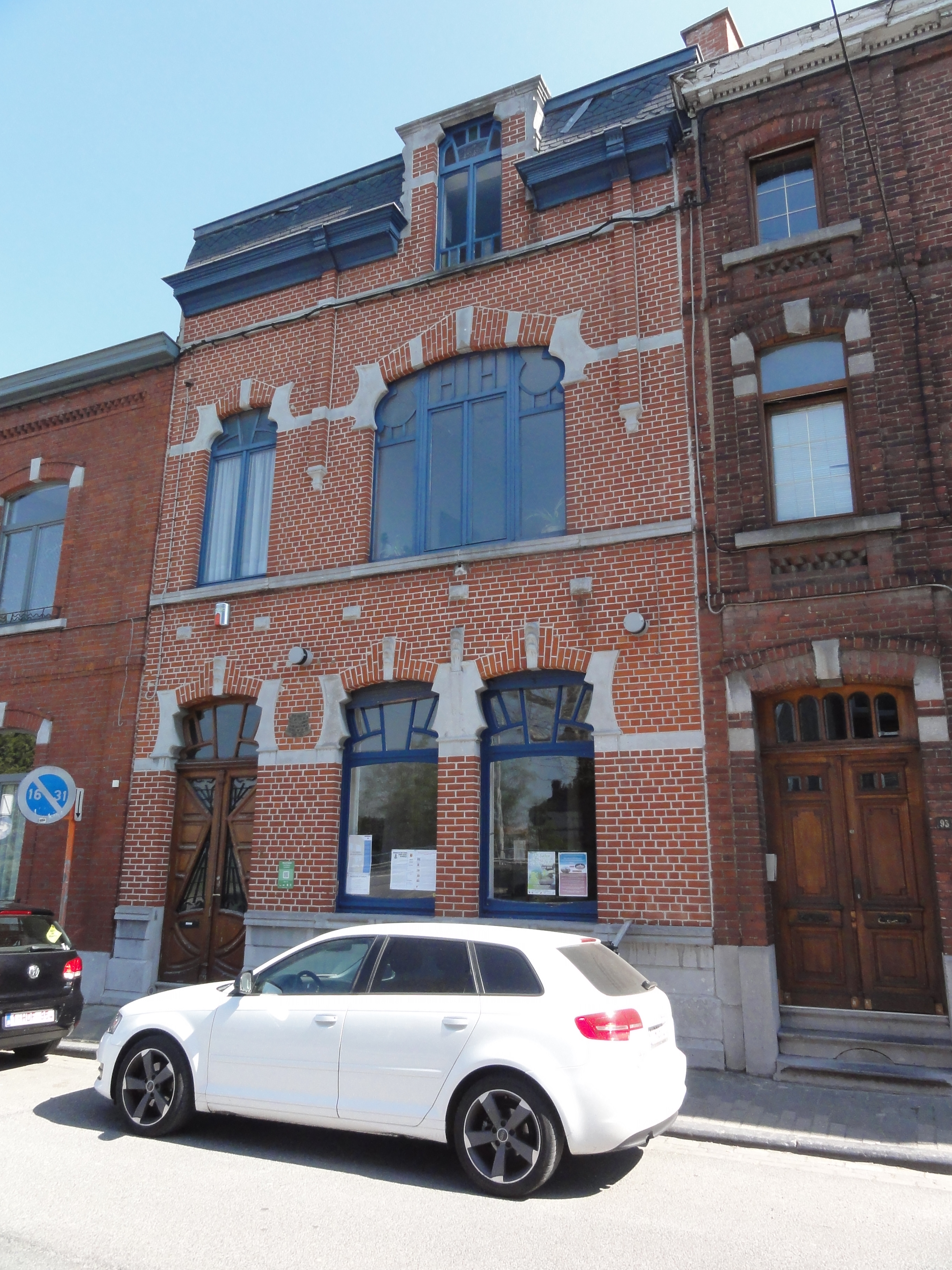
The house of surrealist painter René Magritte.

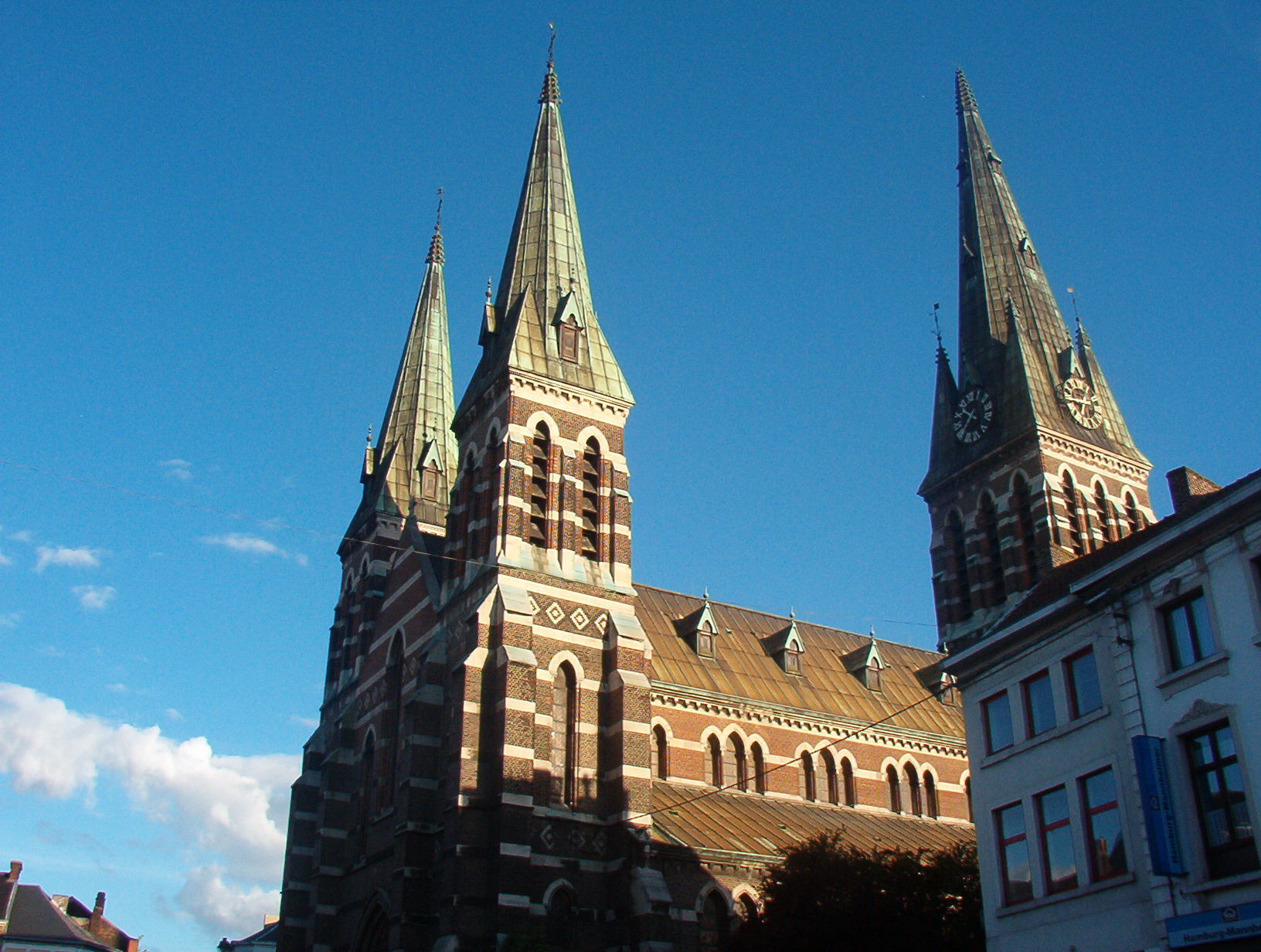
The Church of Saints Peter and Paul.

== Events ==
- Cavalcade, Palm Sunday.
- Since 1961, a folkloric march starting at the Saint-Roch chapel takes place every year on the Sunday following the feast of the Ascension.

== Famous inhabitants ==
- Claude Barzotti, Belgian singer of Italian origin
- Fernand Deschamps (1868-1957), Belgian intellectual
- Claire Kerwin (1919-2005), artist who was born in Châtelet
- René Magritte (1898-1967), surrealist painter, spent his youth in Châtelet
- Louis Mottiat, (1889-1972), belgian cyclist
- Pierre Paulus (1881-1959), expressionist painter and designer of the rooster of the Walloon flag, was born in Châtelet
- Octave Pirmez (1832-1883), author, was born in Châtelineau
- Joel Robert, six-time motocross world champion

== Twin cities ==
- France: Vimoutiers
- Italy: Casteltermini
