= Marcel Thiry =

Belgian poet

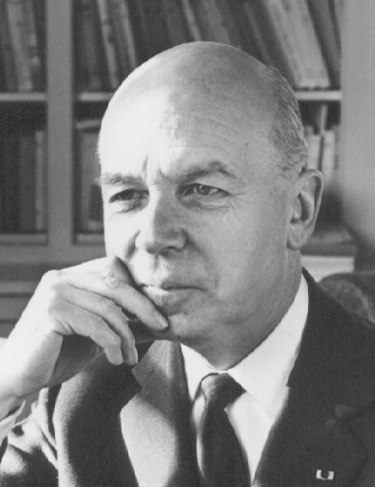
- Born: 13 March 1897; Charleroi, Belgium
- Died: 5 September 1977 (aged 80); Vaux-sous-Chêvremont, Belgium
- Occupation: poet

Marcel Thiry (13 March 1897 – 5 September 1977) was a French-speaking Belgian poet. During World War I, he and his brother Oscar served in the Belgian Expeditionary Corps in Russia.

He was awarded the Prix Valery Larbaud in 1976 for Toi qui pâlis au nom de Vancouver, a book of poems reminiscent of Blaise Cendrars and Guillaume Apollinaire. He is the father of virologist Lise Thiry.

== Main works ==
=== Poetry ===
- Le cœur et les sens (1919)
- Toi qui pâlis au nom de Vancouver (1924), Prix Valery Larbaud
- Plongeantes Proues (1925)
- L'Enfant prodigue (1927)
- Statue de la fatigue Prix triennal de poésie 1934
- Marchands (1936)
- La Mer de la Tranquillité (1938)
- Âges (1950)
- Usine à penser des choses tristes (1957)
- Vie-Poésie (1961)
- Le Festin d'attente (1963)
- Le Jardin fixe (1969)
- Saison cinq et quatre proses (1969)
- L'Ego des neiges (1972)
- Songes et spélonques (1973)
- L'Encore (1975)

=== Novels and short stories ===
- Échec au temps (1945)
- Juste ou la Quête d'Hélène (1953)
- Comme si (1959)
- Nouvelles du Grand Possible (1960)
- Simul et autres cas (1963)
- Nondum jam non (1966)

=== Essays ===
- Voir grand (1921), essai politique
- Hitler n'est pas jeune (1940), pamphlet
- La Belgique pendant la guerre (1947)
- Lettre aux jeunes Wallons (1960), essai politique
- Le Poème et la langue (1967), essai littéraire
