= Lise Thiry =

Belgian scientist (1921–2024)

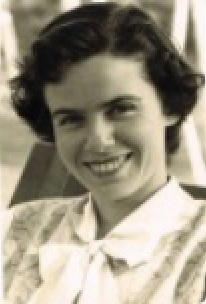
- Born: 5 February 1921; Liège, Belgium
- Died: 16 January 2024 (aged 102); Waterloo, Belgium

Academic background
- Education: University of Liège

Academic work
- Institutions: Pasteur Institute
- Main interests: Virology

Lise Thiry (5 February 1921 – 16 January 2024) was a Belgian scientist and politician. She has been voted one of the top 100 Belgians on a television show on the Belgian French-speaking public channel RTBF.

== Early life and education ==
Lise Thiry was born in 1921 on 5 February in Liège. Her father was Marcel Thiry, who was a leading French poet. She was one of three female students, in 1940, who studied medicine at the University of Liège. She graduated in 1946.

== Career and research ==
Thiry went on to research at the Pasteur Institute in Brussels. In 1951, she created a virology department. She developed a method of screening the AIDS virus (HIV).

In 1990, she became a senator. In 2002, whilst championing the rights of asylum seekers she wrote Conversations with the Clandestine Ones.

Thiry turned 100 in February 2021, and died on 16 January 2024, at the age of 102.

== Awards and honours ==
- In 1990, she was voted "Woman of the Year".
- In 2007, a 70 cent stamp featuring Thiry and the AIDS virus was created.
- In 2001, she was given the Walloon Merit at the rank of Commander.
- In 2025, a new street in Ixelles was named after her.
