= Raphaël Liégeois =

Belgian-Luxembourgish biomedical engineer and astronaut

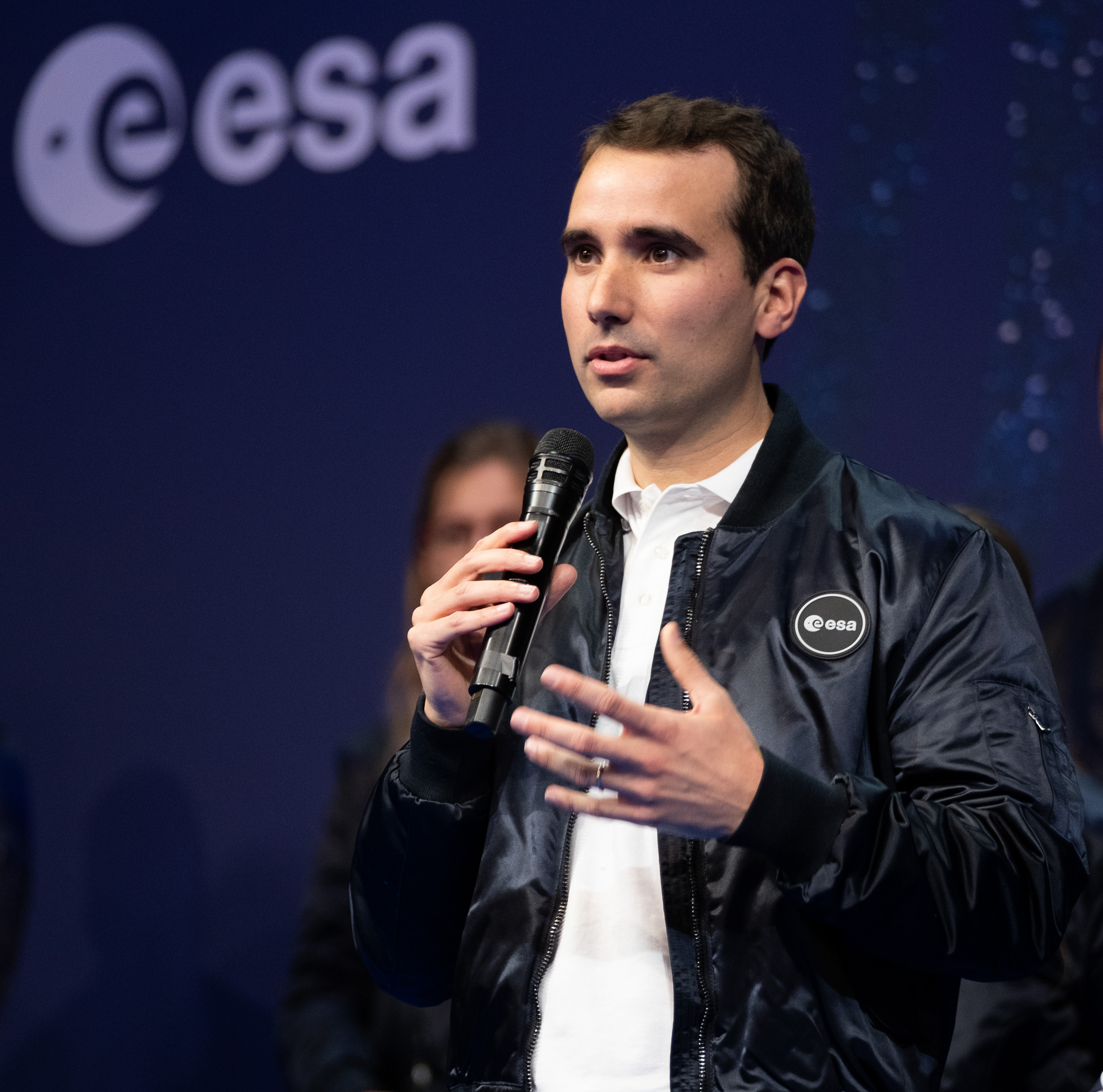
- Liégeois in 2022
- Born: 8 January 1988 (age 38); Namur, Belgium
- Education: University of Liège
- Occupations: Biomedical engineer; astronaut
- Space career

ESA astronaut
- Selection: 2022 ESA Group

Raphaël Liégeois (born 8 January 1988) is a Belgian-Luxembourgish biomedical engineer and astronaut. Liégeois completed a doctorate at the University of Liège on the functioning of the human brain from 2011 to 2015, and then held post-doctoral appointments at the National University of Singapore and the École Polytechnique Fédérale de Lausanne. He has held a teaching and research position at the University of Geneva and the École Polytechnique Fédérale de Lausanne since 2021. He was selected as a member of the 2022 European Space Agency Astronaut Group.

== Early life and education ==
Liégeois was born and raised in Namur, Wallonia, Belgium on 8 January 1988. He attended l'Athénée royal François Bovesse in Namur for secondary school. A significant literary figure of his childhood was Tintin, the main character of the comic The Adventures of Tintin who is a journalist from Belgium who travels around the world. The 1995 film Apollo 13, on the thirteenth mission in NASA's Apollo program, was also a strong influence.

Liégeois studied biomedical engineering at the University of Liège from 2005 to 2011. During this time, he graduated from the École Centrale Paris through an exchange program in 2009, and earned a master's degree in fundamental physics from the Paris-Sud University the following year. He participated in a physics experiment with France's space agency, CNES, while studying in the country.

Liégeois returned to the University of Liège to complete a doctorate in neuroscience from 2011 to 2015. His thesis was written on "Dynamical modelling from resting-state brain imaging" under supervision of professors Rodolphe Sepulchre and Steven Laureys. In 2014, he represented his university in the Belgian final of the science communication contest Ma thèse en 180 secondes (My Thesis in 180 seconds), where he presented his research to a public audience.

== Career ==
=== Academic career ===
As a post-doctoral researcher at the National University of Singapore, from 2015 to 2017, Liégeois searched for neuroimaging markers of neurodegenerative diseases. He worked on models of brain function as a post-doctoral research fellow at the École Polytechnique Fédérale de Lausanne in Switzerland from 2018 to 2021. In 2019, he conducted research as a visiting scholar at Stanford University, in California, United States. Starting in 2021, he has held the permanent position of Research and Teaching Fellow at the University of Geneva and the École Polytechnique Fédérale de Lausanne. In the position, he has taught neuroengineering and statistics alongside his research.

=== Astronaut career ===
Liégeois was one of five career astronauts of the European Astronaut Corps chosen as part of the 2022 selection of astronauts. He will have the opportunity to become Belgium's third person in space, following astronauts Dirk Frimout and Frank De Winne. Shortly before Christmas in the next month, he was received by King Philippe of Belgium at the Castle of Laeken, and he met with prime minister Alexander De Croo, Dirk Frimout and Frank De Winne, and businesspeople in the space industry.

Liégeois completed ESA's Basic Training curriculum at the European Astronaut Centre, and graduated alongside his classmates from "The Hoppers" group on the 22nd of April 2024. On the 22nd of May 2024, Liégeois was announced to be the second in his class to fly a mission to the ISS, following Sophie Adenot, who subsequently flew on SpaceX Crew-12 in February 2026.

As of October 2026, Liégeois had not yet been assigned to a specific Crew Dragon flight; neither SpaceX Crew-13 nor SpaceX Crew-14 included him.

== Personal life ==
A Belgian-Luxembourg national, Liégeois's parents are from Belgian Luxembourg and one of his grandparents is from Luxembourg. His father trained as an engineer and his mother has worked as a psychiatrist. He has held Luxembourgish citizenship since 2018.

Liégeois has two children. After he completed his post-doctoral research in Singapore in 2017, he and his spouse took four months to return to Belgium by bike, meeting with poets in twelve countries throughout Asia and Europe on the way. Their trip attracted the attention of the local Namuroise television channel Canal C.

Liégeois is an active balloon pilot.
