= Morad Hibatan Bazar =

Morad Hibatan Bazar مراد هيبتان بازار
- Village
- Country: Iran
- Province: Sistan and Baluchestan
- County: Chabahar
- Bakhsh: Polan
- Rural District: Polan

Population (2006)
  - Total: 44
- Time zone: UTC+3:30 (IRST)
  - Summer (DST): UTC+4:30 (IRDT)

Morad Hibatan Bazar (Persian: مراد هيبتان بازار, also Romanized as Morād Hībatān Bāzār; also known as Kanar) is a village in Polan Rural District, Polan District, Chabahar County, Sistan and Baluchestan Province, Iran. At the 2006 census, its population was 44, in 7 families.
