= Flag of Wallonia =

- Flag of Wallonia
- Proportion: 2:3
- Adopted: 1975 (French Community); 1998 (Walloon Region)
- Design: Red "bold rooster" on a yellow background
- Designed by: Pierre Paulus

The flag of Wallonia is used by the Walloon Region and French Community of Belgium. It depicts a red "bold rooster" (coq hardi) on a yellow field. Originally associated with the Walloon Movement, the flag was designed between 1912 and 1913. It subsequently became an apolitical symbol of regional identity within Wallonia in the 1960s and 1970s and has enjoyed official status since 1975.

== Origins ==
Over the late 19th century, the Flemish Movement sought to challenge the status of the French language in the predominantly Dutch-speaking regions of Belgium. This led to the emergence of a Walloon Movement in reaction within the largely French-speaking regions of the country which became known as Wallonia. The wallingants remained politically marginal and largely failed to counter flamingant demands about bilingualism and, later, monolingualism in Flanders. However, the Walloon Movement also sought to inspire a sense of cultural patriotism and shared regional identity among French-speaking Belgians which they considered to be compatible with support for the Belgian nation-state. Its emergence was accentuated by the political dominance of the Catholic Party after 1884 which was particularly popular among Flemish voters and opposed by anticlerical French-speaking Liberals and Socialists.

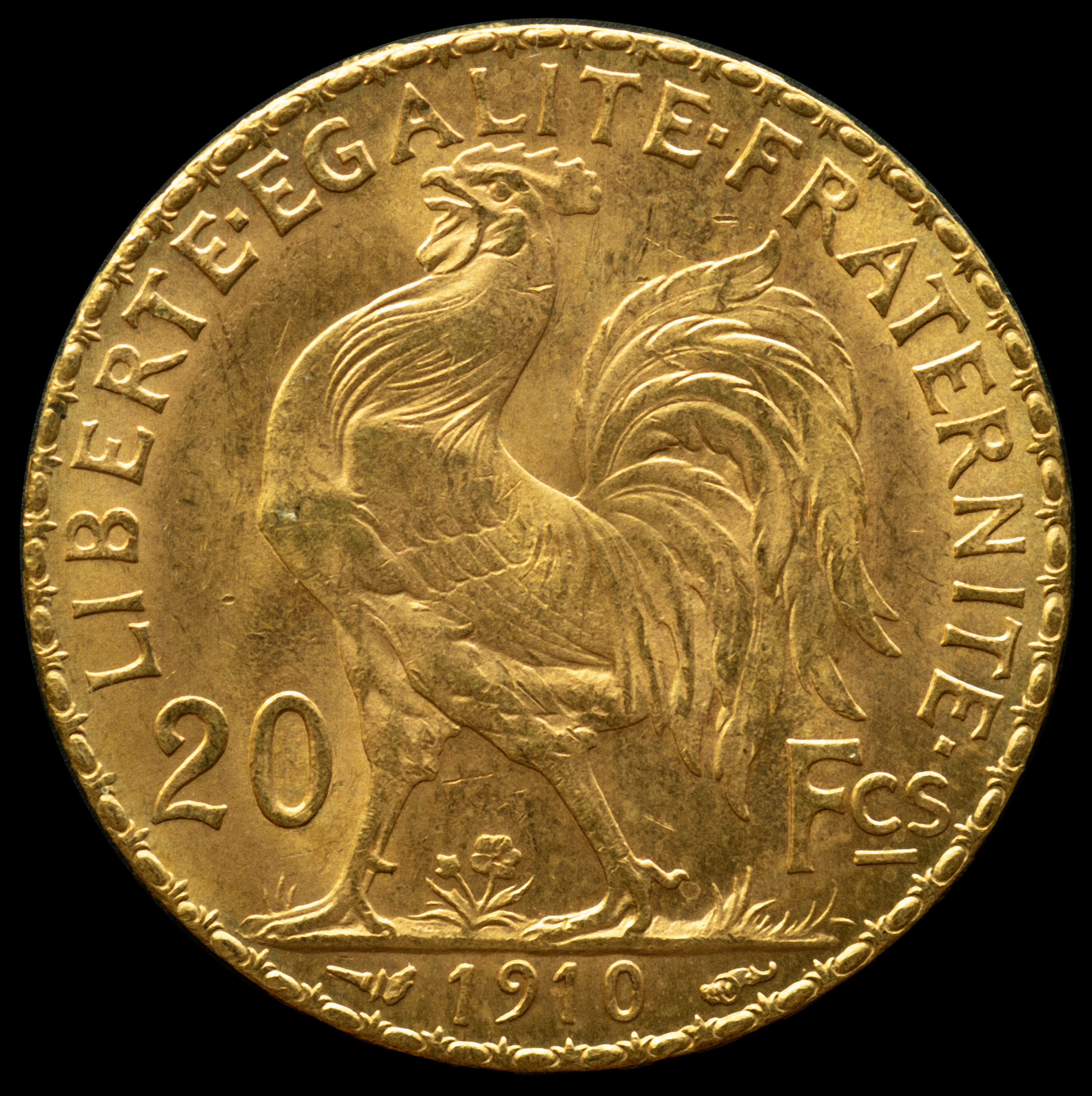
The crowing Gallic rooster on a 1910 coin. The emblem gained renewed popularity as a national symbol of France after 1900.

After the Catholic Party further increased its majority in the 1912 general election, the Walloon Movement underwent a period of expansion. A gathering of sympathisers was convened in a "Walloon Assembly" (Assemblée wallonne) in July 1912 which resolved to study the possibility of adopting a flag, emblem, observance, and anthem to celebrate Walloon identity. A commission presided over by Richard Dupierreux was established to study possible designs. This proved highly controversial. Various heraldic or regional symbols such as the perron were considered but rejected in favour of a rooster. The report was presented at the next meeting of the assembly held at Mons on 16 March 1913.

Two Walloon flags with ribbons in the colours of the flag of Belgium on the cover of a book of patriotic songs, c.1913

The design proposed by Dupierreux depicted a "bold rooster" (coq hardi) with its head tilted upwards and leg raised. Roosters had not appeared as a heraldic symbol in any part of modern-day Wallonia. The small village of Limelette in Brabant Province was the only place to have historically used it as an emblem. By contrast, the Gallic rooster (coq gaulois) had long been used as a national symbol in France. Although attested for centuries, it had gained renewed popularity under the French Third Republic (1871–1940). Many wallingants at the time were Liberals inspired by the political ideals of the French Revolution and therefore instinctively Francophile. However, the Walloon "bold rooster" was in a different pose from the Gallic rooster, which was usually depicted crowing, head raised upwards with both feet on the ground.

A watercolour design of the "bold rooster" was produced by the Belgian artist Pierre Paulus which is currently in the collections of the Museum of Walloon Life. At the time, various other bold rooster designs were also commonly used for several decades. Although there was considerable disagreement over the choice of the emblem and the colours, the flag was formally adopted by Walloon activists at a meeting at the Municipal Museum of Ixelles, Brussels, on 20 April 1913.

== Adoption ==
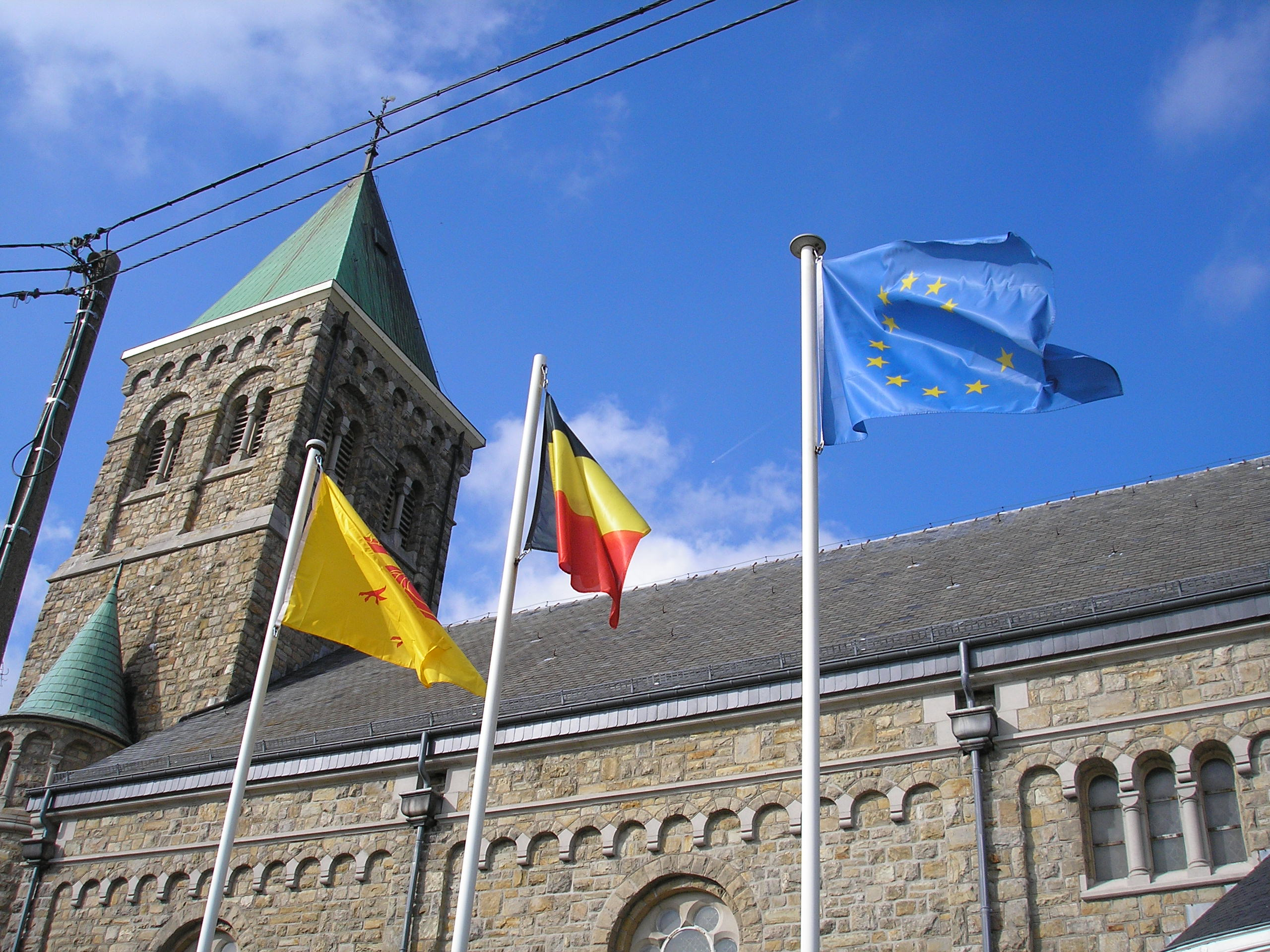
The Walloon flag flying alongside the flags of Belgium and the European Union at Sourbrodt. This combination can be found on most public buildings in Wallonia.

Although initially popular among wallingants, the flag fell into disuse during the Interwar period and World War II. The "bold rooster" design superimposed on the flag of France was used by political groups such as Wallonie Libre supportive of Rattachism. As this was a minority position even within the Walloon Movement, it led to suspicion of the design as too "French" among more mainstream political sympathisers, especially within the powerful conservative Christian Social Party (Parti social chrétien).

The Walloon flag and "bold rooster" only gradually became seen as apolitical regional symbols amid the emergence of federalism as a major issue in Belgian politics during the 1960s and 1970s.

On 20 July 1975, the flag was adopted formally as the emblem of the recently created French Cultural Community (Communauté culturelle française) established by the 1970 state reforms. This was the first time that it had achieved official status. It continues to be used by the French Cultural Community's successor entity, the French Community of Belgium (Communauté française de Belgique).

On 15 July 1998, the Walloon Parliament adopted the same design as the flag as the emblem of the Walloon Region. As a result, public buildings in Wallonia generally the Belgian flag, European Union flag, and Walloon flag together, sometimes alongside provincial and municipal flags.

== See also ==
- Flag of Flanders
- Flag of the Brussels-Capital Region
- Day of the Walloon Region
