= Claire Kerwin =

- Born: 1919; Chatelet, Belgium
- Died: 2005 (aged 85–86); Toronto, Ontario, Canada
- Known for: Acrylics, collages, metalworking, mixed media, painting, pastels, graphics, printmaking
- Awards: Medal of Service (City of Toronto)

Claire Kerwin (1919–2005) was a Belgian-born Canadian artist that worked and experimented with several different mediums which included acrylics, collages, metalworking, mixed media, painting, pastels, graphics, and printmaking. She was born in Chatelet, Belgium and emigrated to Canada in 1947 at the age of 28. Her artistic style consisted of combining the elements of urban life and nature. Kerwin was a member of five different Canadian art societies, including the Royal Canadian Academy of Art. Kerwin's works were exhibited in public and private collections in Canada as well as internationally in Belgium, France, England, Brazil, and the United States. The Art Gallery of Northumberland houses several of her works in their permanent collection. Kerwin was awarded a Medal of Service from the City of Toronto for her contributions to the local art scene.

== Career ==
Kerwin was a volunteer at the Royal Ontario Museum in Toronto, Ontario. She went bi-weekly to the Discovery Gallery, drawing different artifacts, such as Egyptian mummies and prehistoric plants, to test her skills. Her drawings were reproduced on labels for visitors to provide quick identification of the specimens in the gallery. Kerwin enjoyed her volunteer work here saying, "I could live another 30 years to work on all the exhibits in the Discovery Gallery….I find it a stimulating challenge". The museum curator, Ruth Freeman, saw her drawing and began assigning her to draw the artifacts that could be touched in the exhibit from all 19 curatorial departments. She was bilingual in French and English which helped her create labels for the drawings in both languages.

Kerwin had a printmaking studio on Monteith St in Toronto where she practiced her mixed media prints. She acquired her materials, consisting of old copper and lead, from parking lots and gutters. She made mixed-media prints through copper and lead collages against etched Masonite or fine Japanese paper. She pleated the lead, hammered it, then fluted it to mould it into what she desired. Her appreciation for lead goes back to her childhood in Belgium where she saw many lead works in galleries and liked the lead pots and pans in her house. She began working with metals in her prints in 1974. Since then, she has garnered increased attention in Canada and around the world. Her visits to Sudan and Morocco brought different colours to her works that can be noticed in the coppers and lead that she used. She credits the environment around her for giving her all these different materials saying, "Nature has done all the work for me". Kerwin also bought some materials when needed. She enjoyed the possibilities that exist with the combination of the metals and the papers. Kerwin displays the prints over a landscape to create a new visual aesthetic that is reminiscent of her inspirations from Morocco.

In 1991, Kerwin was commissioned by the Toronto Dance Theatre to design a set for the production, Noli Me Tangere. The background is composed of three luminous and monumental rock formations. She was inspired to create this type of set after a trip to South Africa. These formations heightened the drama of the production as stated by Alina Gildiner from The Globe and Mail. It allowed the dancers to interact with it in a way that created the possibilities for things to be presented fully or suggested in the production.

Kerwin expressed her sense of country and city in her work as seen in her work at the Gallery Pascal in 1983. She used marigolds as a representation of the countryside. They were presented up close against a lush green backdrop to symbolize the summertime. The embossed paper and lead pieces in her work relate to the city, symbolizing the dullness and gray that can define city life at times. Kerwin had a lot of experience in print-making which was helpful when she explored new ground in paper executed on pastel, gouache, and acrylic.

Her skill in graphics garnered international attention from large corporations who commissioned her to create works for them. She has collections at several companies such as Bell Canada, The Bank of Brazil, and Imperial Oil of Canada, among others.

== Accolades ==
- She received a Medal of Service from the City of Toronto
- She was a member of the Royal Canadian Academy of Art, John B. Aird Gallery, and the Drawing Council of Canada
- She had one-woman exhibitions at the Merton, Pascal and Art Dialogue Galleries in Toronto, Alice Peck Gallery in Burlington, and St. Jean-de-Luz in France
- She had group exhibitions at the Canadian Embassy in Paris, Ontario House in London, Royal Canadian Academy of Art, University of Waterloo, Society of Canadian Artists, John B. Aird Gallery, and the Shaw-Rimmington Gallery

== Personal life ==
She is the daughter of Emile and Elisabeth Roland. She married her husband George Kerwin in 1947 and had two children with him, Michael and Shawn. Michael was a musician and Shawn was a stage designer. She enjoyed playing tennis, squash, and farming in her spare time. Kerwin and her husband owned a farm in Cobourg, Ontario where she spent time when she was not in the city. She was a member of the Toronto Lawn Tennis Club. She lived and worked at her studio on Monteith St. in Toronto until her death in 2005 at the age of 86.

== File & archive locations ==
- Canadian Women Artists History Initiative Documentation Centre, QC
- University of British Columbia – Fine Arts Library
- Vancouver Art Gallery, BC – Library
- Winnipeg Art Gallery, MA – Clara Lander Library
- London Public Library, ON
- National Gallery of Canada, ON – Library and Archives
- Art Gallery of Ontario – Edward P. Taylor Research Library and Archives
