= Rodolphe Sepulchre =

Professor of engineering at the University of Cambridge and KU Leuven

Rodolphe Sepulchre is a professor of control engineering in the Control Group at the University of Cambridge and at KU Leuven, with research interests in nonlinear control and neural behaviours.

== Education and early career ==
Sepulchre achieved a bachelor's degree from Université catholique de Louvain between 1989 and 1990, before remaining at this institution to study a PhD in mathematical engineering between 1990 and 1994. Between 1990 and 1997 he was employed as a researcher, and held a postdoctoral position at the University of California, Santa Barbara from 1994 to 1996. In 1997 he achieved a post as a professor at Université de Liège in the department of Electrical Engineering and Computer Science.

== Published works ==
He has written two books: Optimisation Algorithms on Matrix Manifolds, published in 2007, and Constructive Nonlinear Control, published in 1996.

His main research interests include nonlinear control; optimisation on manifolds; coordination, synchronization, and consensus on nonlinear spaces; and neural behaviors, and has published over 90 papers in these areas.

In May 2022 he published a paper in Proceedings of the IEEE entitled 'Spiking Control Systems', in which he incorrectly cited the Wikipedia article on the homeostat, claiming

According to Wikipedia [47], the homeostat did not work very reliably.

== Other works ==
Sepulchre was a guest on the podcast inControl, and has been the editor of IEEE control systems magazine since February 2020.

== Awards ==
- Sepulchre was awarded the IEEE Control Systems Society Antonio Ruberti Young Researcher Prize in 2008.
- In 2020 he received the George S. Axelby Outstanding Paper Award of the IEEE Control Systems Society for his paper on differential dissipativity, co-written with Professor Fulvio Forni.
