= Museum of Walloon Life =

Museum in Liège, Belgium

Coordinates: 50.6470°N 5.5762°E

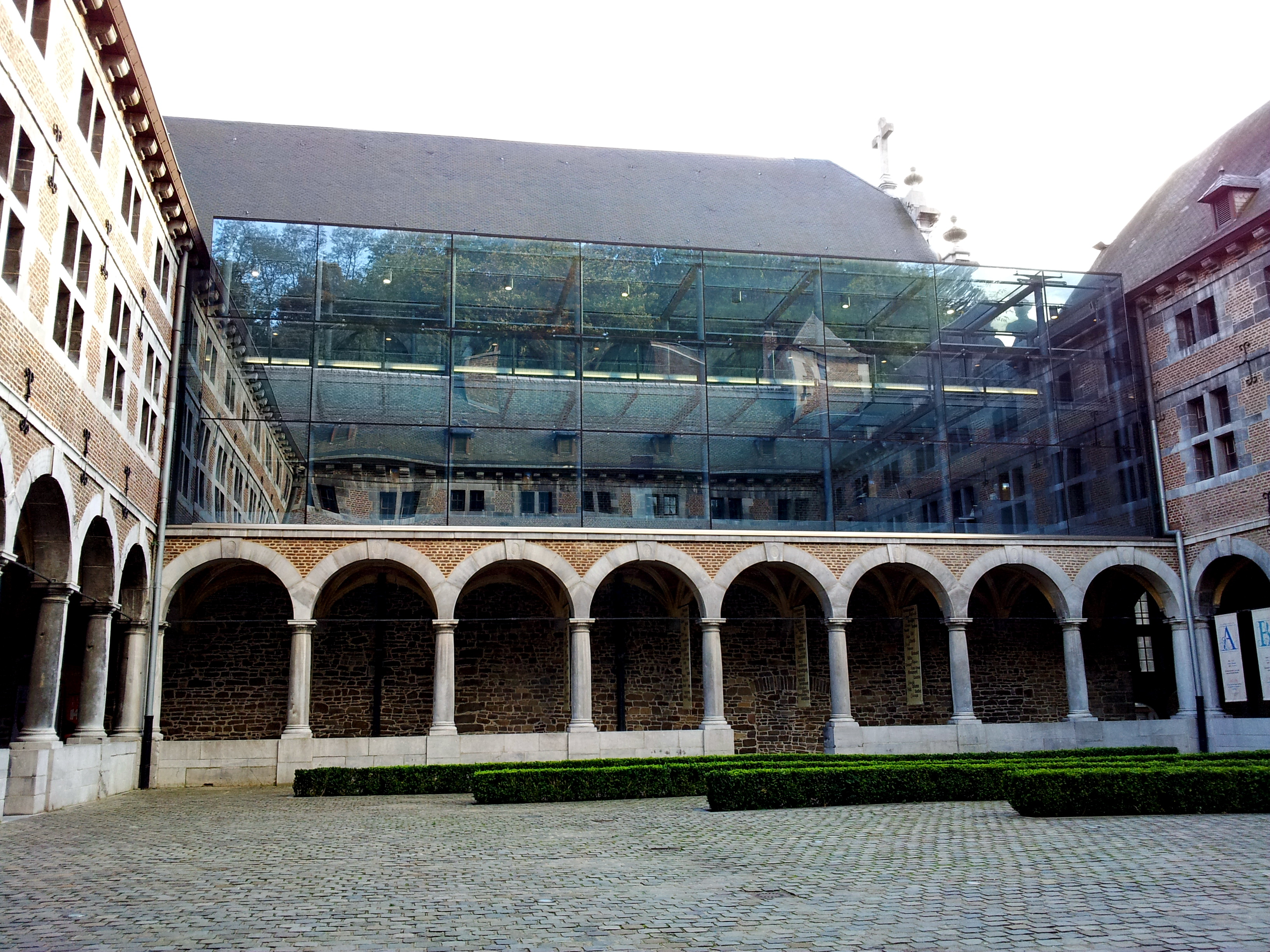
View of the museum's main building in the former Cour des Mineurs

The Museum of Walloon Life (French: Musée de la Vie wallonne) is a folk museum in Liège, Belgium. The museum covers the folklore and ethnography of the region of Wallonia. It was established in 1913.
