= Pierre Kroll =

Belgian cartoonist and caricaturist

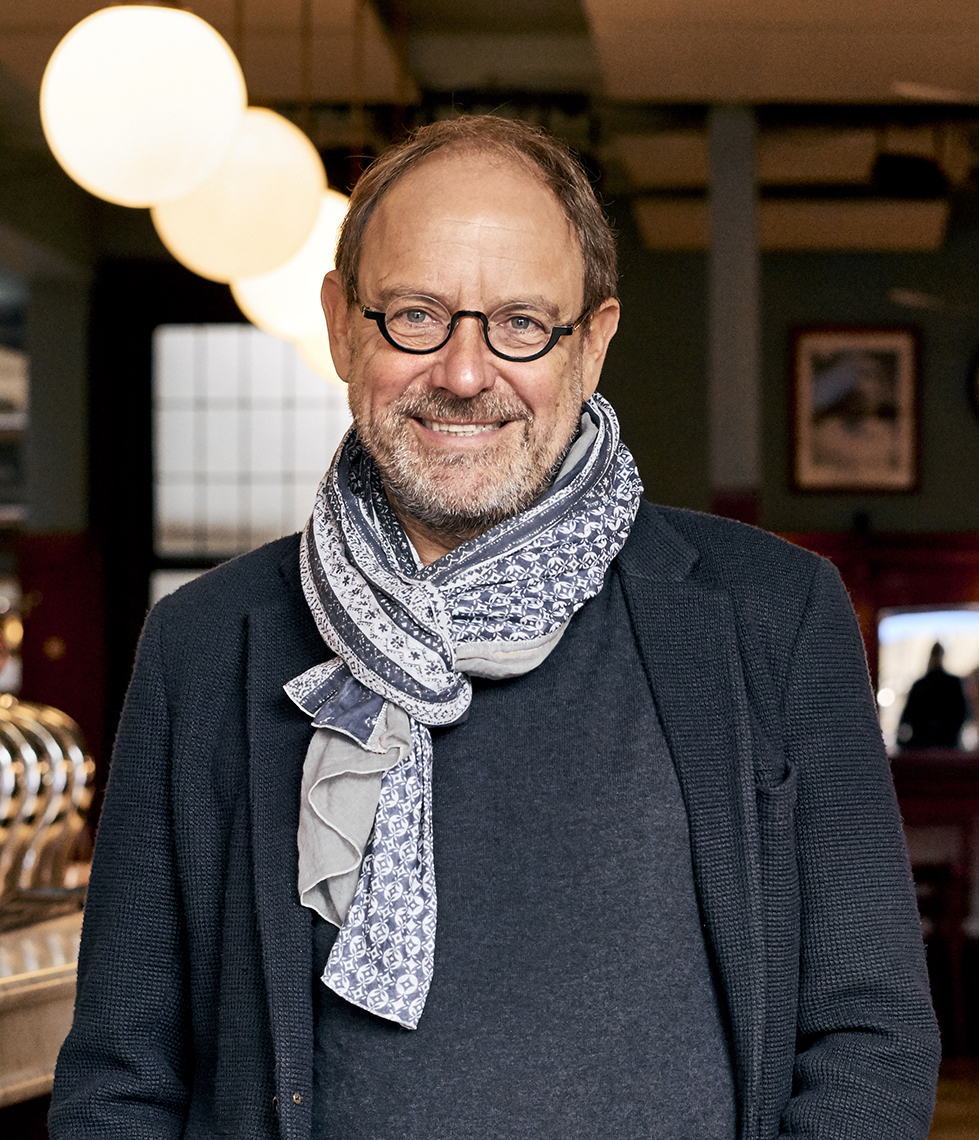
- Born: 25 March 1958 (age 67); Gwaka, Belgian Congo
- Occupations: Cartoonist, caricaturist

Pierre Kroll (born 25 March 1958 in Gwaka, Belgian Congo) is a Belgian cartoonist and caricaturist. He is the nephew of architect Lucien Kroll.

== Bibliography ==
- Numa Sadoul, Dessinateurs de presse : entretiens avec Cabu, Charb, Kroll, Luz, Pétillon, Siné, Willem et Wolinski, Grenoble, Glénat, 2014, 215 p. ISBN 978-2-344-00016-8
