= Chanctonbury Hill =

Protected area in West Sussex, England

Coordinates: 50.895°N 0.380°W

- Site of Special Scientific Interest
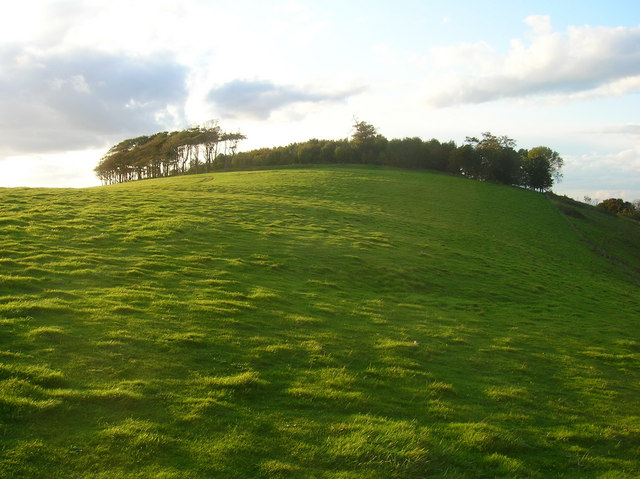
- Chanctonbury Ring
- Location of Chanctonbury Hill.
- Area of search: West Sussex
- Grid reference: TQ 140 119
- Interest: Biological
- Area: 82.7 hectares (204 acres)
- Notification date: 1985
- Location map: Magic Map

Chanctonbury Hill is an 82.7-hectare (204-acre) biological Site of Special Scientific Interest west of Steyning in West Sussex. Part of it is Chanctonbury Ring, an early Iron Age hillfort which contains two Romano-Celtic temples and which is a Scheduled Monument.

This site on the steep slope of the South Downs is mainly woodland with some areas of chalk grassland. A dew pond has great crested newts, a species protected under the Wildlife and Countryside Act 1981. More than sixty species of breeding birds have been recorded, including meadow pipits, corn buntings and green woodpeckers.
