= Henry Woodyer =

English architect (1816–1896)

- Born: 1816; Guildford, Surrey, England
- Died: 1896 (aged 79–80)
- Occupation: Architect
- Buildings: Holy Jesus' Church, Lydbrook; St Martin's Church, Dorking
- Projects: Cranleigh School

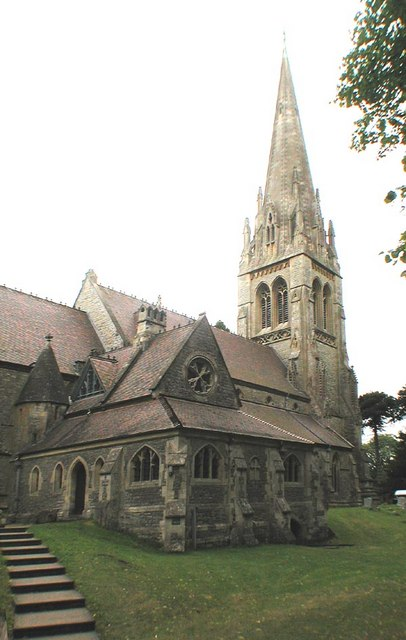
Holy Innocents, Highnam, Gloucestershire

Henry Woodyer (1816–1896) was an English architect, a pupil of William Butterfield and a disciple of Augustus Pugin and the Ecclesiologists.

== Life ==
Woodyer was born in Guildford, Surrey, England, in 1816, the son of a successful, highly respected surgeon, who owned Allen House in the Upper High Street. His mother came from the wealthy Halsey family who owned Henley Park, just outside Guildford.

Woodyer was educated first at Eton College, then at Merton College, Oxford. As a result, he could claim to be one of the best educated architects since Sir Christopher Wren. Whilst at Oxford, he became involved in the Anglican high church movement and throughout his career he saw his work as an architect as a means of serving the church.

== Works ==
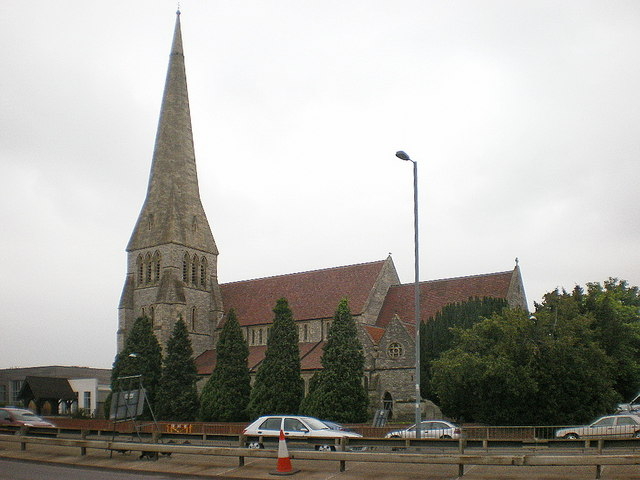
Holy Trinity Church, Millbrook, Southampton

=== Churches (new) ===
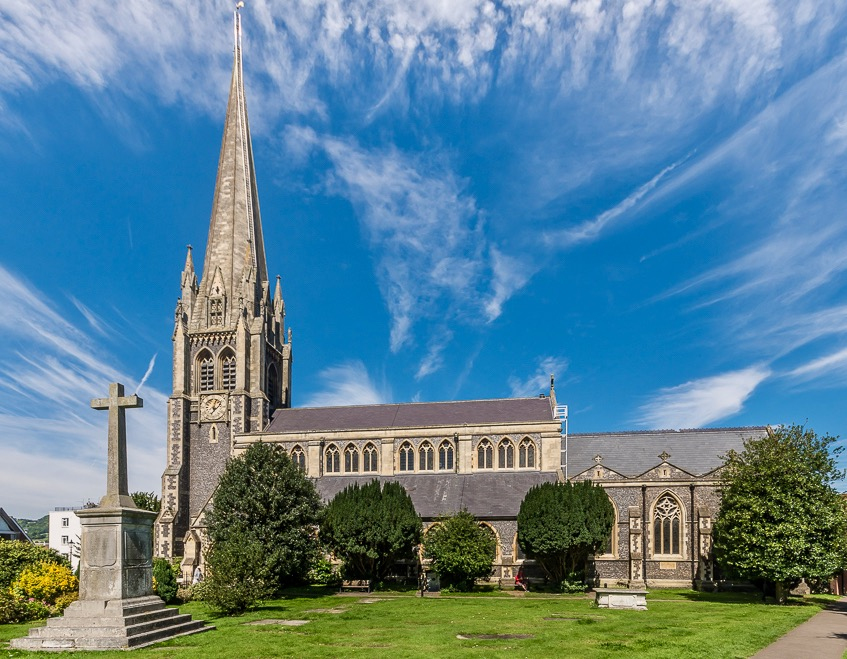
St Martin's Church, Dorking

- Holy Innocents' Church, Highnam, Gloucestershire (including sexton's cottage), 1847
- St Michael's Church, Camberley, Surrey, 1849–51
- St Paul's Church, Sketty, Swansea, Glamorgan, 1849–50, for John Henry Vivian
- Holy Jesus' Church, Lydbrook, Gloucestershire, 1850–51
- Christ Church, Christchurch Road, Reading, Berkshire, 1861-2
- St Peter's Church, Hascombe 1862, described by Betjeman as "a Tractarian work of art"
- St Paul's Church, Langleybury, Abbots Langley (1863–65)
- St Augustine's Church, Haggerston, 1866-7, Woodyer's only London church, closed in 1983 and converted to arts centre in 1997
- St Martin's Church, Dorking (1868–77) described by Sir Nikolaus Pevsner as Woodyer's most important
- All Saints Church, Portfield, Chichester (1869–71)
- St Andrew's Church, Grafham, Surrey
- St James Church, Farnham, Surrey (1876)
- St John the Baptist Church, Odo Street, Hafod, Swansea, 1878–80, for Henry Hussey Vivian
- St John the Evangelist Church, Woodley, Berkshire, 1873, for Robert Palmer
- Holy Trinity Church, Millbrook, Southampton (1873–1880)
- Church of St Luke, Burpham Surrey, 1859
- Church of St Peter and Holy Cross, Wherwell, Hampshire
- Chapel at Convent of St John the Baptist, Clewer, Berkshire (1881)

=== Churches (restoration or rebuilding) ===
- St Blaise Church, Milton, Berkshire (now Oxfordshire), 1849–51
- St Nicolas' Church, Newbury, Berkshire, 1858
- St Mary's Church, Caldicot, Monmouthshire, 1859
- St Andrew's parish church, Clewer, Berkshire: north arcade, 1858
- St John the Evangelist, Twinstead, Essex, 1859–60
- St John the Baptist parish church, Berwick St John, Wiltshire, 1861
- St Bartholomew's parish church, Wanborough, Surrey, 1861
- Church of St Peter and St Paul, Long Compton, Warwickshire, 1862–3
- St George's parish church, Evenley, Northamptonshire 1864-5
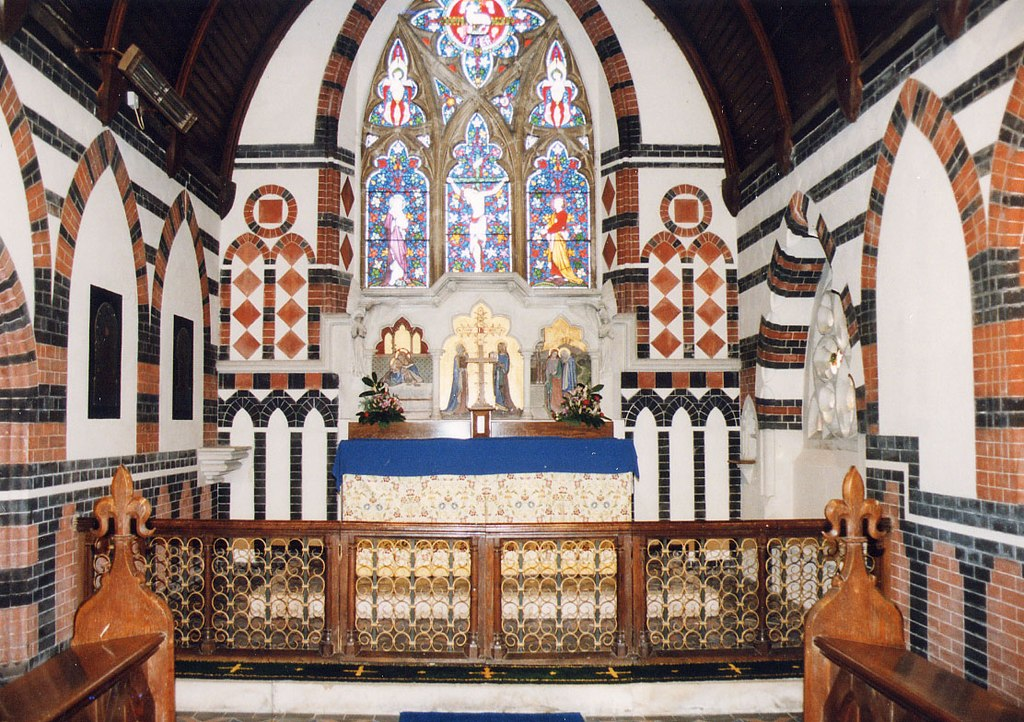
- St John the Evangelist, Twinstead, Essex
  St Lawrence parish church, Toot Baldon, Oxfordshire, 1865
- St Swithin's parish church, Compton Bassett, Wiltshire: chancel, chancel chapels and north porch (1866)
- St Laurence parish church, Caversfield, Oxfordshire, 1874
- All Saints parish church, Wokingham, Berkshire.
- St John the Divine parish church, Patching, West Sussex, 1888–89

=== Other institutional buildings ===
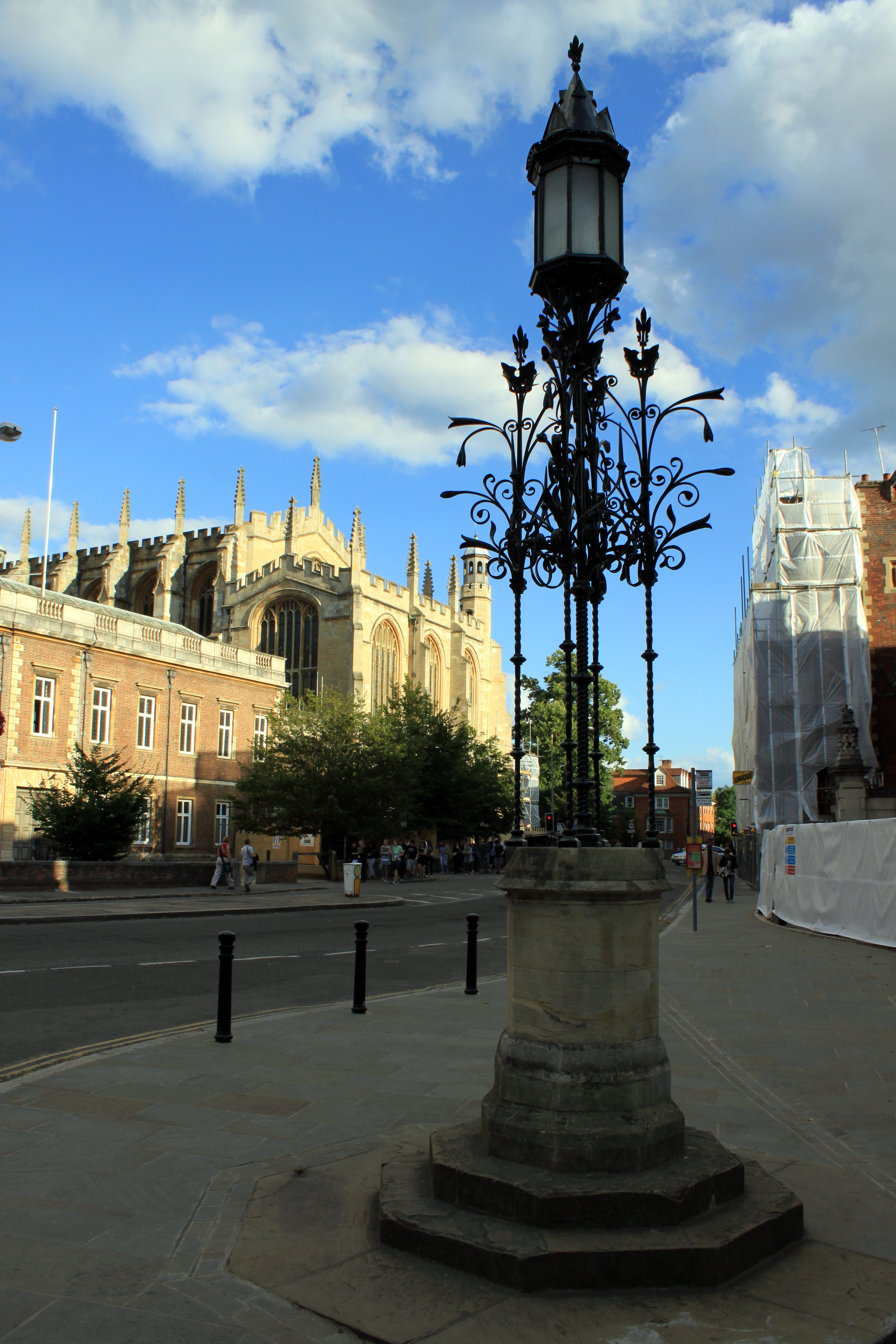
"Burning Bush", Eton College

- School (now the Stewart Hall), Sketty, Swansea, 1853, for John Henry Vivian
- St Edmund's Church School, Salisbury, Wiltshire, 1860
- Fisherton Anger Church School, Fisherton, Salisbury, Wiltshire, 1867
- House of Mercy, Clewer, Berkshire, 1853–73
- Cranleigh School, Surrey 1863–65 and the Chapel 1869
- New Schools, Eton College, 1861–63
- The "Burning Bush", Eton (1864)
- St Michael's College, Tenbury Wells, Worcestershire
- The Chapel at St Thomas's Home for the Friendless and Fallen, Darlington Road, Basingstoke dedicated on 21 July 1885, the eve of St Mary Magdalen's feast day
- All Saints Hospital and Chapel, Eastbourne (1867–74)
- House of Mercy, Ditchingham, Norfolk (1859)

=== Domestic buildings ===
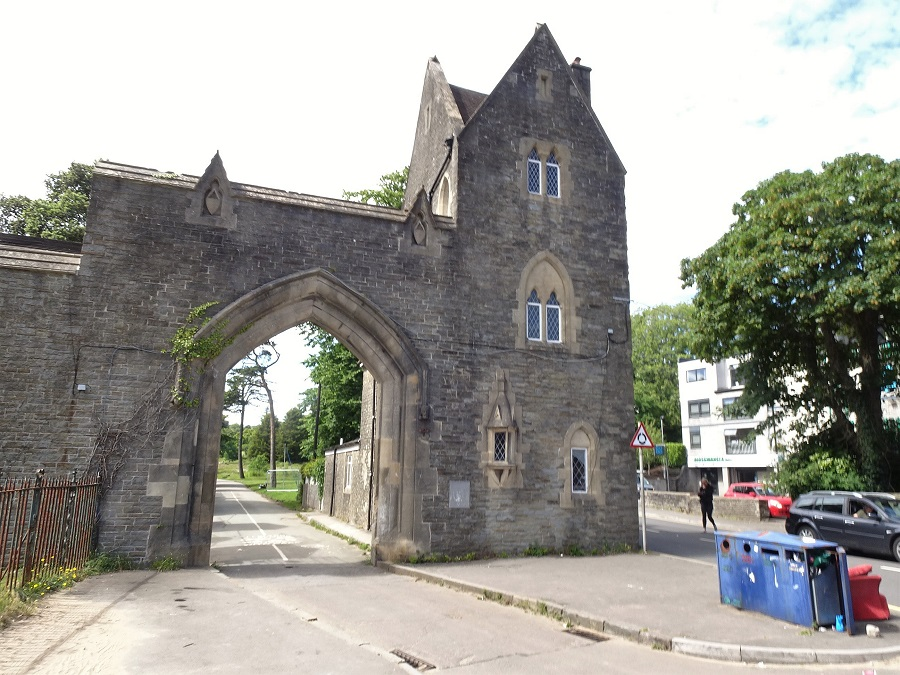
Park gate and Brynmill Lodge

- Woodyer House, Bramley, Surrey
- Muntham Court in Findon, West Sussex rebuilt in Jacobean style between 1877 and 1887
- Alterations to Parc Wern (now Parc Beck), Sketty, Glamorgan, 1851–3 for H.H. Vivian
- Church Cottage, Tutshill, Gloucestershire, c. 1852.
- Brynmill Lodge (gate-lodge) and (attributed) Verandah (a small Gothic house, 1853) at Singleton Abbey, Swansea) for J.H. Vivian
- Alterations to Hall Place, Buckinghamshire, 1868
- Alterations to Tyntesfield, Wraxall, Somerset for Matilda Blanche Gibbs, 1885–89
- Twyford Moors House Twyford, Hants 1861
- The Old Rectory, Creeting St Mary, Suffolk 1863
- St Paul's Church Hall, Reading – Built 1859 as a school, but for the first two years was used for religious services before the completion of Christ Church. Later the building was used as a church hall for the adjacent St Paul's Church, Whitley Wood. It was sold by the church in 1983 and was converted to private housing.

== Sources ==
- Elleray, D. Robert (2004). Sussex Places of Worship. Worthing: Optimus Books. ISBN 0-9533132-7-1.
- Elliott, John; Prichard, John (2002). Henry Woodyer: Gentleman Architect. University of Reading. ISBN 978-0-7049-1331-8.
- Nairn, Ian; Pevsner, Nikolaus (1965). The Buildings of England: Sussex. Harmondsworth: Penguin Books. ISBN 0-14-071028-0.
- Newman, John; Stephen Hughes; Anthony Ward (2004). Glamorgan. New Haven and London: Yale University Press. ISBN 0-300-09629-1.
- Pevsner, Nikolaus (1966). The Buildings of England: Berkshire. Harmondsworth: Penguin Books.
- Pevsner, Nikolaus (1960). The Buildings of England: Buckinghamshire. Harmondsworth: Penguin Books.
- Pevsner, Nikolaus; Cherry, Bridget (revision) (1975) [1963]. The Buildings of England: Wiltshire. Harmondsworth: Penguin Books. ISBN 0140710264.
- Sherwood, Jennifer; Pevsner, Nikolaus (1974). The Buildings of England: Oxfordshire. Harmondsworth: Penguin Books. ISBN 0-14-071045-0.
- Tyack, Geoffrey; Bradley, Simon; Pevsner, Nikolaus (2010). The Buildings of England: Berkshire. New Haven and London: Yale University Press. ISBN 978-0-300-12662-4.
