= Muntham Court =

Demolished country house in West Sussex, England

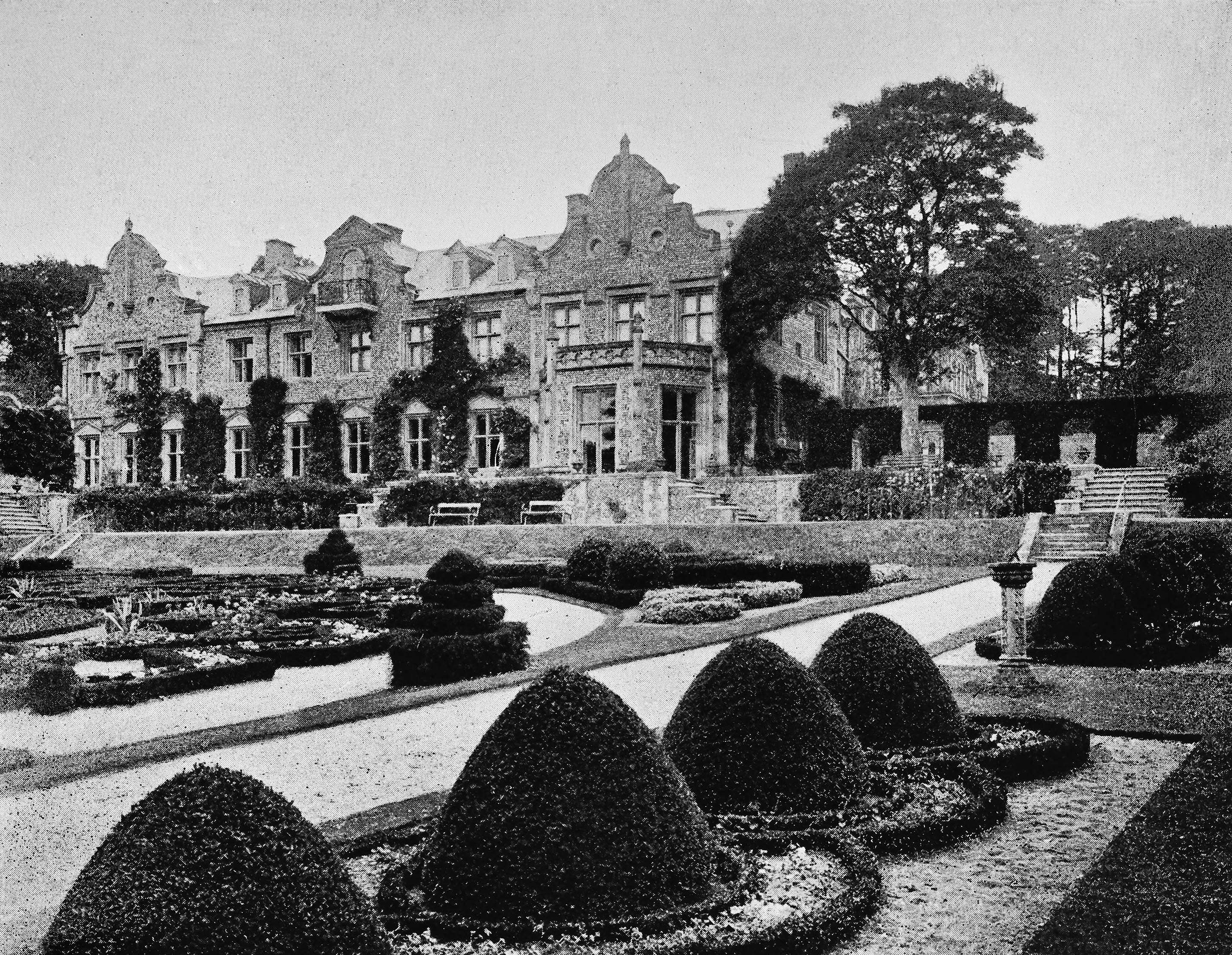
- East and north sides of the house in late 19th or early 20th century
- Interactive map of the Muntham Court area

General information
- Status: Demolished
- Architectural style: Jacobean
- Location: Findon, England
- Coordinates: 50°52′32″N 0°25′25″W
- Completed: 1371
- Renovated: 1741 (enlarged); 1743 (rebuilt as a hunting lodge); 1877-1887 (remodelled in Jacobean style)
- Demolished: 1961
- Client: Thomas de Mundham (first house); Joseph Merlott (1741 house); Antony Brown (1743 house); Harriet Thynne (Jacobean house)

Technical details
- Material: Red brickwork covered by flintstone

Design and construction
- Architect: Henry Woodyer

Muntham Court was a country house and estate near a village of Findon, West Sussex, England. In the 1800s the estate covered 1,890 acres (760 ha). Following the death of Ulric Oliver Thynne in 1957 the estate measuring about 1,025 acres (415 ha) was split up and auctioned off. In 1961 the house was demolished to make way for Worthing Crematorium that opened its doors on 5 January 1968.

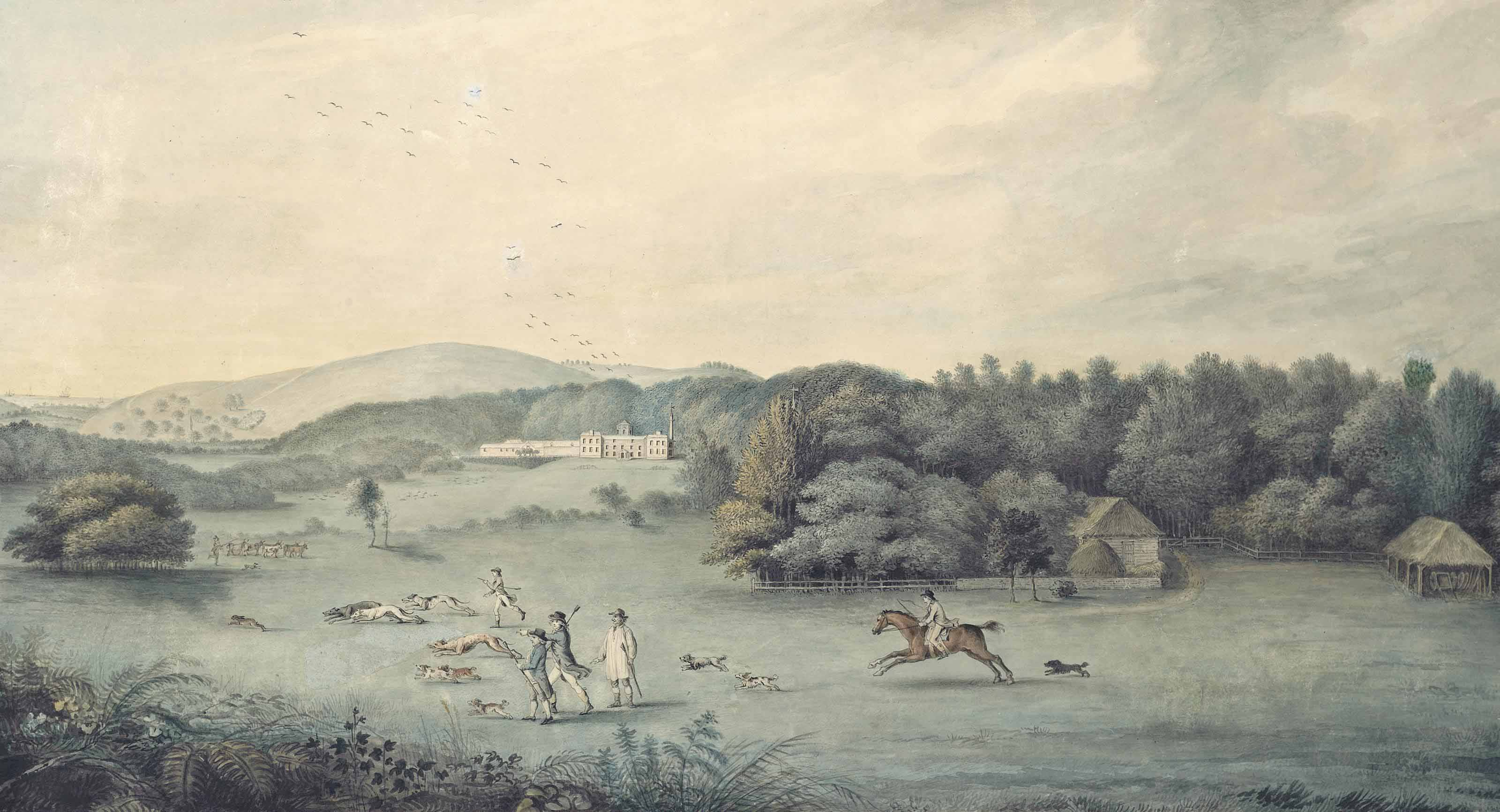
Hare coursing at Muntham Court in the 18th century, gentleman on horseback is likely William Frankland

== History ==
=== Early history ===
Muntham Court history dates back to the early 11th century when the lands were held by Osward in 1066. Later in 1073 William de Braose had rights of free warren in the area and his family held 38 manors in Sussex. In 1086 it was held by Morin. In the 14th century the estate was divided in two, Itchingfield passed to the Marlott family. In 1371 Thomas de Mundham, son of Johanne is presumed to have built the first house on the site, later in 1372-1372 he gave all the rights to the Manor of Muntham to Thomas Cornwallis from London.

=== 19th century ===
In 1840 the estate was purchased by Thomas Fitzgerald of Binfield House, Berkshire. At this time 19 people farmed the estate, including 15 men and 4 boys. The staff consisted of a housekeeper, cook, 14 servants, lady's maid, steward, under butler, 2 toolman and coachman John Taylor (who lived with his wife in one of the lodges).

In 1850 Muntham was sold to Harriet Thynne, Marchioness of Bath and it remained in the Thynne family until the death of Colonel Ulric Oliver Thynne in 1957. Lady Thynne was the daughter of Alexander Baring, 1st Baron Ashburton and Ann Louisa Baring. In 1830 she married Henry Thynne, 3rd Marquess of Bath. At this time only the north side of the house was full-size. A single-storey laundry was located on the east side, while kitchens and pantries were on the west side. When Harriet Thynne first saw the red brickwork house, she said: "The upper classes do not live in red brick." At this time the house and the estate saw significant changes. The architect Henry Woodyer remodelled the house in flint in the Jacobean style and added a chapel between 1877 and 1888. The east side was squared off by removing a single-storey building and enlarging it by five window bays with bedrooms located above. The Dutch gables were extended, and Bath stone features were added. A difference in elevation meant that the east side of the house was being viewed from below, making it more imposing compared to the north side despite being the same size. The work was done with taste and restraint, making it a good example of a Victorian attempt to recreate early Jacobean style.

=== 20th century ===
The staff was reduced during World War I and Colonel Ulric Oliver Thynne was assigned to command the Royal Wiltshire Yeomanry. At the time of World War II the estate was occupied by the Army.

In the first part of the 20th century a pair of wrought-iron gates from Seville Cathedral were installed at the East Lodge entrance, thought to have been plundered in 1812 during the Peninsular War.

==== Estate sale ====
Following the death of Colonel Thynne the house remained empty and the estate was put up for sale. It was advertised in Country Life magazine by John D Wood & Co. as appropriate for use as a school or a nursing home, but no suitable buyer was found and the estate measuring about 1,025 acres (415 ha) was split up. At the time of sale the main house had mains electricity and oil-fired central heating. Additionally an animal and corn farm of 802 acres (325 ha) was available to let for £1,492 (equivalent to £30,379 in 2025) per year. The estate was sold off at the auction on the 31st of October 1958 at Worthing Town Hall, auctioneer was Mr. Hazell.

Lots sold at the auction
| Property | Sale price | Sale price adjusted for inflation | Buyer |
|---|---|---|---|
| The Estate | £63,000 | equivalent to £1,282,759 in 2025 | |
| Country House | £10,000 | equivalent to £203,613 in 2025 | Groves Bros. |
| Muntham Farm | £25,000 | equivalent to £509,031 in 2025 | Mr. J Heath |
| Garden House with neighbouring plot | £4,000 | equivalent to £81,445 in 2025 | |
| No.3 New Cottage | £700 | equivalent to £14,253 in 2025 | |
| No.4 New Cottage | £850 | equivalent to £17,307 in 2025 | |
| Old Well House | £3,000 | equivalent to £61,084 in 2025 | |
| Two Ivy Cottages | £2,700 | equivalent to £54,975 in 2025 | |
| The East Lodge | £1,900 | equivalent to £38,686 in 2025 | |
| North End House | undisclosed amount | undisclosed amount | Mrs. Madge |

==== Demolition ====
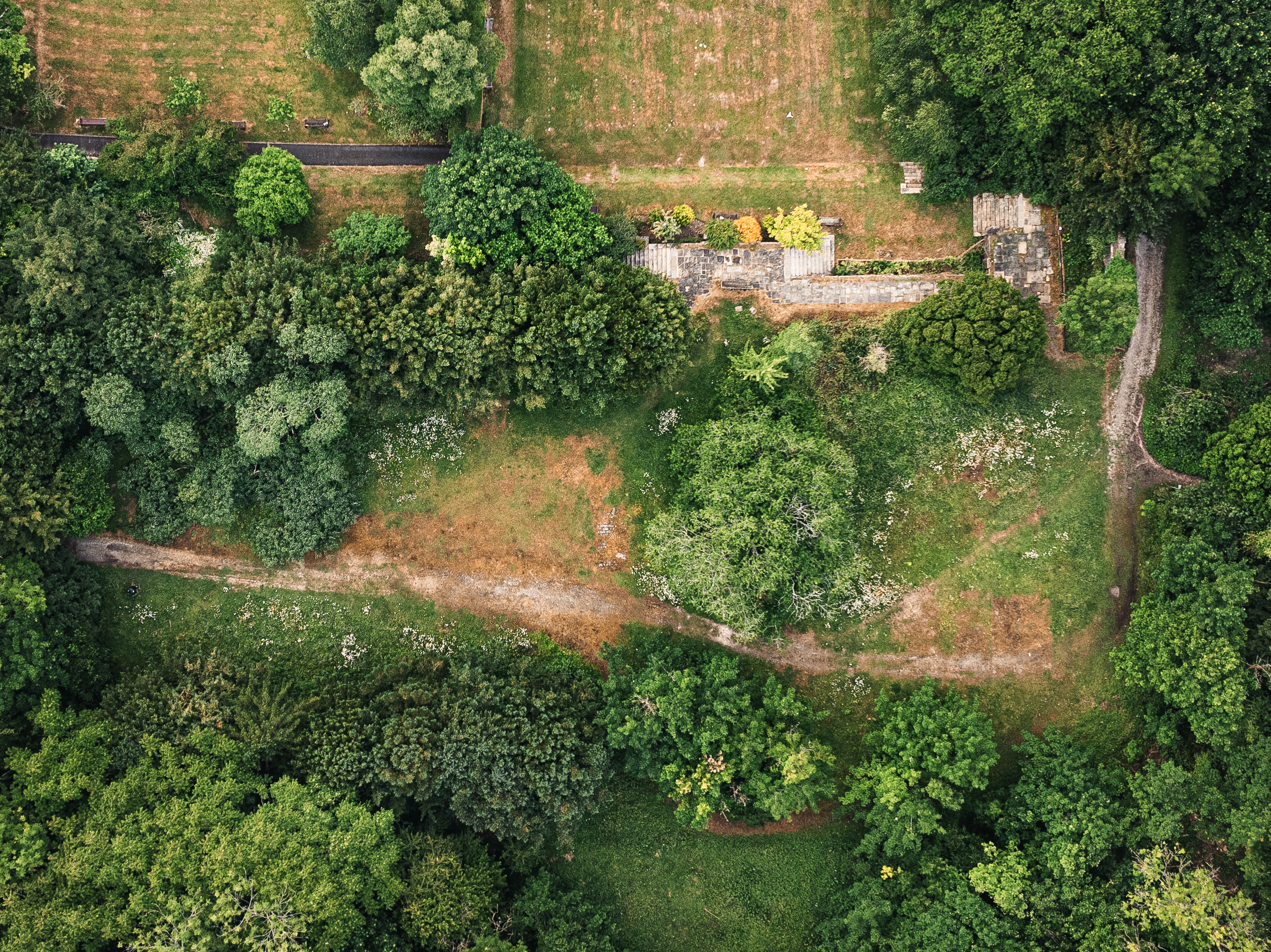
Site of the house in 2023, showing surviving stone steps and a section of the original wall

In the 20th century many irreplaceable country houses were lost to redevelopment. After a campaign for a crematorium to serve Worthing led by Alderman Brackely, Worthing Borough Council purchased the country house and adjacent land from property developers Groves Brothers (who had obtained a planning permission for a crematorium). The house was demolished in 1961 after it was said to be found unsafe and surplus to local council requirements. At the time a large number of historic buildings in Worthing were demolished by Worthing Council with often little opposition from the public. Since then the town's planning activities are conducted with far greater sensitivity due to provisions in the Town and Country Planning Acts in the late 1960s as well as a shift in public opinion in 1970s towards preservation of Britain’s country houses as part of the national heritage.

==== Crematorium ====
Construction of Worthing Crematorium complex began in 1967 on the site of the old tennis courts. It was designed under leadership of Borough Architect of Worthing Council Frank Morris and received Architectural Design Project Award for 1966. The crematorium opened its doors on 5 January 1968. The first cremation service, of Isobelle Maude Tarry, was three days later on 8 January 1968.

== The estate grounds ==
=== Gardens and parkland ===
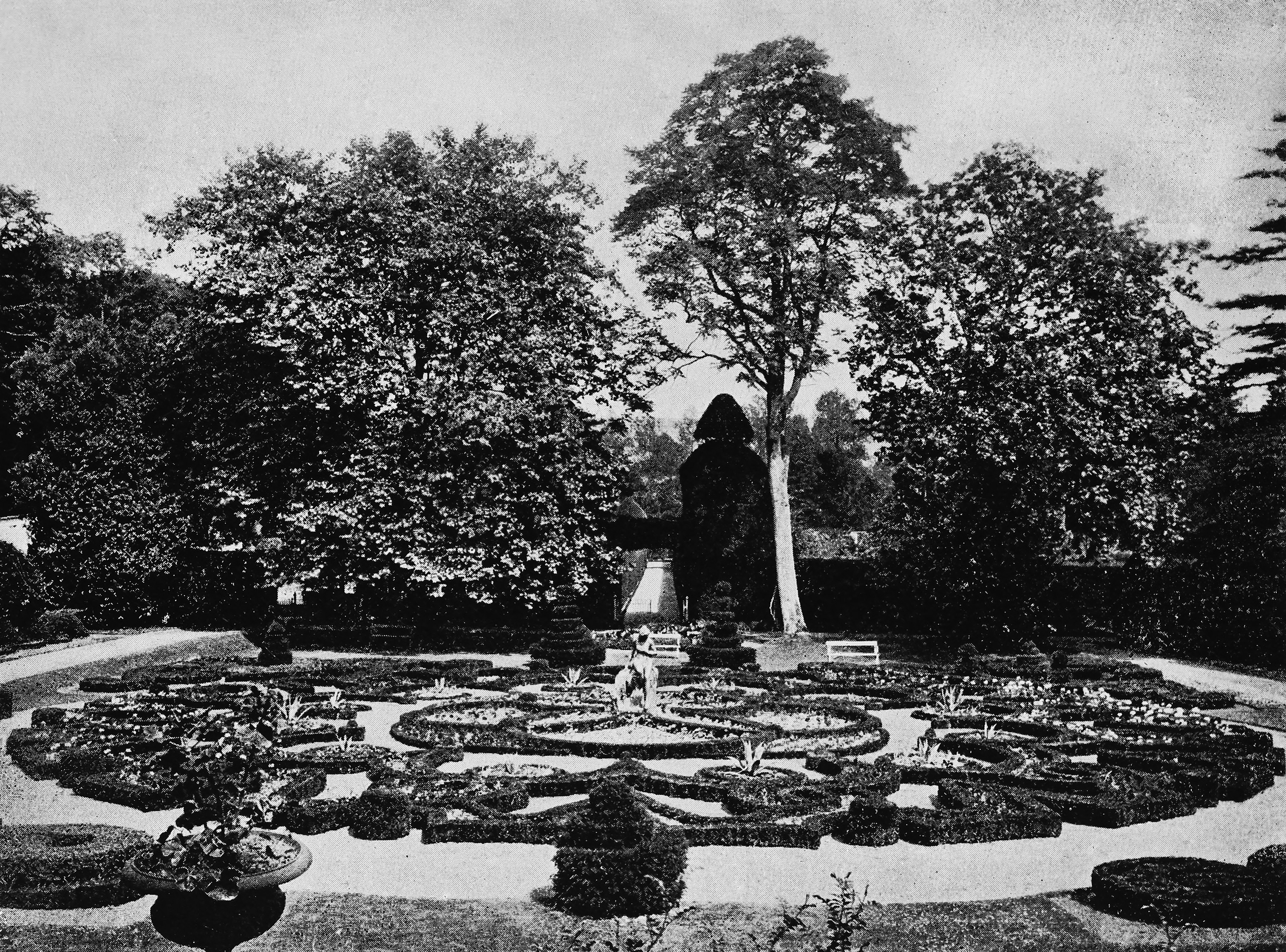
Crown Garden at Muntham Court in late 19th or early 20th century

In the second part of 19th-century new gardens at Muntham Court were designed in the popular at the time 'old-fashioned' style, with tall hedges dividing rectangular green courts. The gardens used to feature great arcaded topiary hedges on the east side of the house and along the main entrance drive to the north. Conifers from the Americas, as well as cedars, Contimental pines, Araucaria araucana and weeping beech, were among the mature trees planted by the previous generations.

The Crown Garden was laid out for Harriet Thynne on the east side of the house. An elaborate design of dwarf box hedges radiated out from the centre with gravelled walkways meandering through beds of seasonal flowers and agaves. The pattern is claimed to have been inspired by an embroidered design of a baby's cap crown. Box and yew topiaries surrounded the crown pattern, adding to the impression of a 17th-century garden.

The gardens have changed little in the first part of the 20th century following the death of Lady Ulric Thynne but have since been flattened to make way for the crematorium.

=== Private burial ground ===
A private burial ground of the Thynne family and the estate is located on the Downland south of the house. It is now part of the Muntham Court Romano-British site - a scheduled monument that includes Iron Age and Romano-British settlements. The burial ground dates back to the death of Edward Thynne in 1925. People who lived on the estate were later buried alongside the family.

=== The Ice House ===
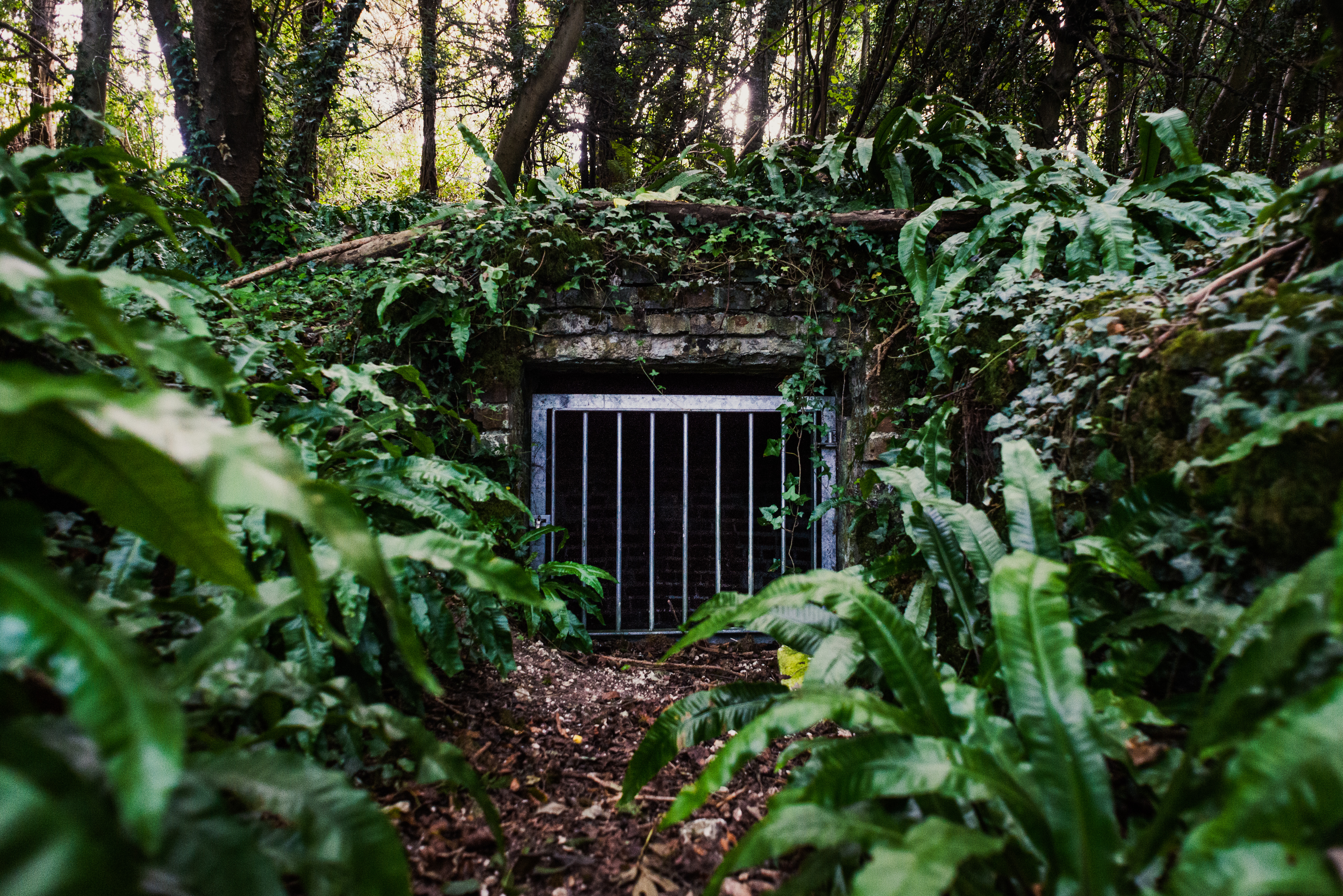
Muntham Court ice house in 2021

By the 18th century it became common for country homes to have their own ice house. At the time ice houses were not used for storing food due to insufficient size, but rather for cooling drinks and producing cold confections. The ice house at Muntham Court still stands on the north-facing slope of the hill. It is located about 100 metres (330 ft) south-west from the site of the house and about 450 metres (1,480 ft) from ice source.

Floor plan and cross-section of Muntham Court ice house

The ice house was most likely constructed in the middle of the 19th century along with the house and is included on the Ordnance Survey map that dates 1843 to 1893. The pit is circular as this form is the strongest, 2.49 metres (8 ft 2 in) in diameter, 21 cubic metres (740 cu ft) with brick walls. The passage is straight, about 3 metres (9.8 ft) long with likely 2 doors, 2 steps down and flint walls.

== See also ==
- Muntham Court Romano-British archeological site, used to be part of the estate now a Scheduled Monument.
