= Muntham Court Romano-British site =

Archaeological site in West Sussex

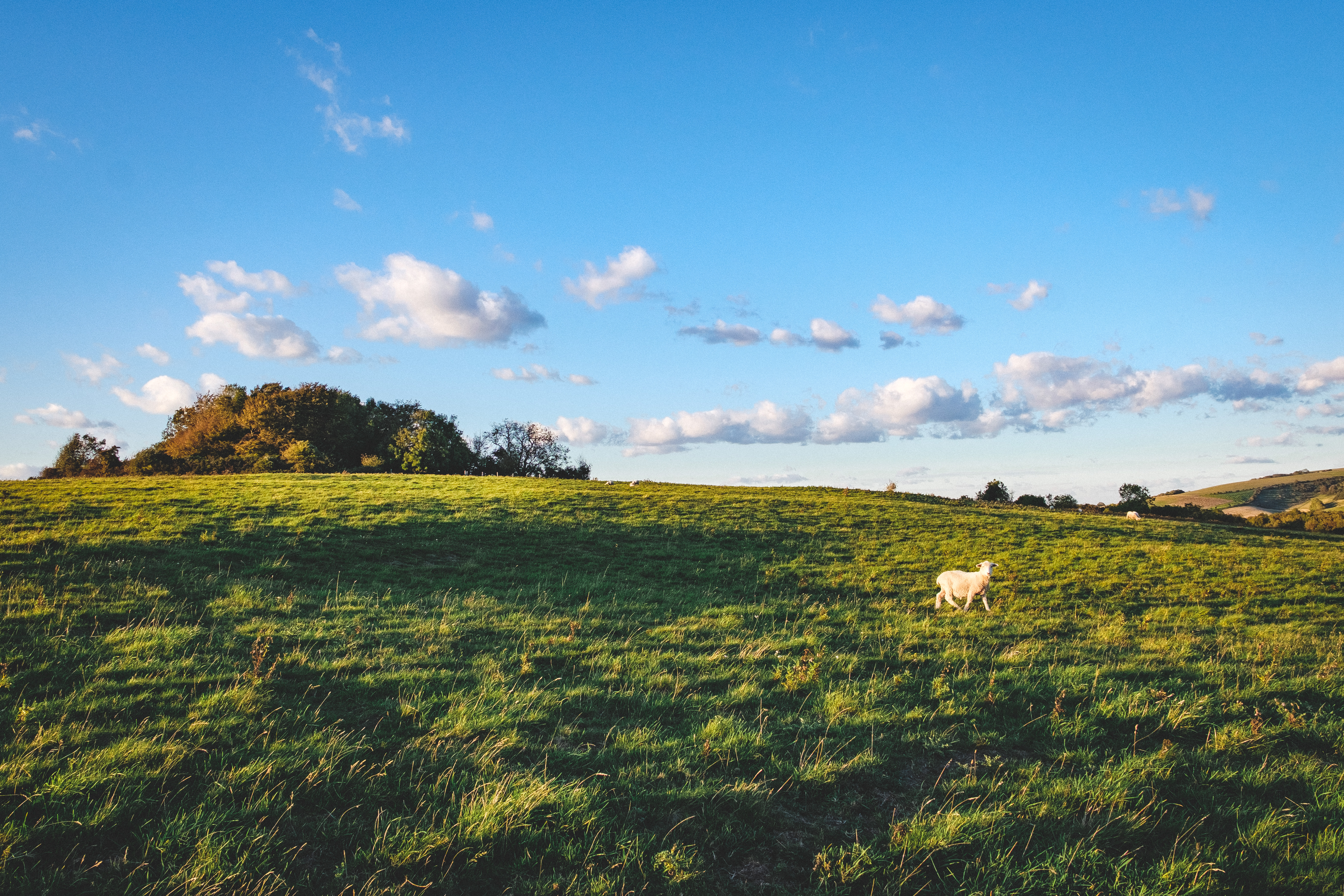
- View of the site from south-eastern side, overlooking approximate location of the settlements

- Location within West Sussex
- 50°52′22″N 0°25′23″W
- Location: Findon
- OS grid reference: TQ 11105 09314

Scheduled monument
- Official name: Muntham Court Romano-British site
- Reference no.: 1005850

The Muntham Court Romano-British site is an archeological site situated on the western edge of the village of Findon in West Sussex. It is a scheduled monument that includes Iron Age and Romano-British settlement.

== Description ==
The site was excavated in the 1950s by Mr. G.P. Burstow and Mr. G.A. Holleyman at a cost of about £50 (equivalent to £227 in 2025) with equipment borrowed from Brighton College (Junior School). It revealed an extensive late Iron Age and Romano-British settlement including housing structures, trackways, field boundaries as well as a temple or a shrine. A 76.2 metres (250 ft) deep well can be found in the adjacent field to the south.

=== Iron Age Settlement ===
The late Iron Age settlement is located at the top of the hill and includes several hundred post holes marking probable locations of huts and corn drying racks. A storage pit can also be found. The settlement was partially enclosed by a palisade with a shallow ditch marking an eastern edge of the site, it survives as a buried feature. Finds from the site include fragment of a Bronze Age perforated macehead, Iron Age pottery as well as spindle whorls and loom weights.

=== Roman temple ===
The Romano-British temple is located at the summit of the hill and can be seen as earthwork marked by a circular depression 11 metres (36 ft) in diameter. The shrine itself was constructed from wood rather than stone and consisted of two structures, one square and the other trapezoidal, both marked by post-holes. A copper alloy plaque of a boar from the site may have been associated with a Roman temple at Chanctonbury Ring. It is now located at Worthing Museum and Art Gallery alongside other artefacts from the site, including a 2nd century enamelled fish brooch and a 3rd century musical instrument mouthpiece.

== Archeological finds ==
A number of archeological finds from the site are held at the Worthing Museum (both on display as well as in storage). This list presents notable finds in alphabetical order.

Item	Description	Date	Material	Location	Image
Bill hook	An iron hook used for cutting plants.	1st - 4th century AD	Iron	Worthing Museum	
Boar plaque	A small copper plaque of a charging boar (100 millimetres (3.9 in) by 40 millimetres (1.6 in)).	1st - 4th century AD	Copper alloy	Worthing Museum	
Bones and shells	Animal bone and oyster shell fragments	1st - 4th century AD	Bone and shell	Worthing Museum	
Enamelled fish brooch	A brooch in the shape of a fish with blue, red and green enamel 30 millimetres (1.2 in) long.	2nd century AD	Copper alloy Enamel	Worthing Museum	
Model leg	A crude model of human leg.		Clay	Worthing Museum	
Musical instrument mouthpiece	A metal mouthpiece for a musical instrument.	3rd century AD		Worthing Museum	
Needle and hairpin	Bone needle and a bone hairpin, 85 millimetres (3.3 in) and 50 millimetres (2.0 in) long respectively.	1st - 4th century AD	Bone	Worthing Museum	
Penannular brooch	Small metal broach, 26 millimetres (1.0 in) diameter.	1st - 2nd century AD	Copper alloy	Worthing Museum	
Saw blade	A saw blade fragment, 60 millimetres (2.4 in) long.	1st - 4th century AD	Iron	Worthing Museum	
Sceptre pommel	A hollow object 105 millimetres (4.1 in) long that may have served as a pommel for a sceptre.	1st - 4th century AD	Copper alloy	Worthing Museum	
Shield boss	Copper shield boss perforated at the corners	1st - 4th century AD	Copper alloy	Worthing Museum	
Stud	Ornamented stud 23 millimetres (0.91 in) diameter.	1st - 4th century AD	Copper alloy	Worthing Museum	
Wire tongs	Thin wire tongs 100 millimetres (3.9 in) long when bent.	1st - 4th century AD	Copper alloy	Worthing Museum	

== Burial Ground ==
A private burial ground of the Thynne family and the Muntham Court Estate is located within the tree clump at the highest point of the hill. It is dating back to 1925 with a death of Edward Thynne. People who lived on the estate were buried at a “staff cemetery” alongside the family. Members of the Thynne Family buried here include:

- Edward Thynne
- Tom Thynne
- Alice Rachel (the daughter of Lord Henry)
- Colonel Thynne and his wife Marjory

Edwards’s parents and his brother Tom have been exhumed from Findon church by Colonel Thynne and re-buried here. A headstone for Edwards’s grave was designed by Sir Edward Lutyens (who designed many other memorials, including The Cenotaph) and the same design was used for Tom’s grave. A stone cross from the original grave can now be seen among the trees in the middle of the clump. Edwards’s parents were re-buried with their original headstone.

According to a rumour in Findon at a time, Edward’s death was a suicide and he could not therefore be buried on consecrated ground. The Coroner’s inquest found that it was in fact a tragic accident involving accidental discharge of a pistol. Edwards grave and later the rest of the cemetery have been consecrated.

An obelisk likely erected by William Frankland has been moved around the Muntham Court Estate over the years. It can be seen on 1837 map standing close to the current site of the burial ground.
