= Holy Jesus Church, Lydbrook =

Church of England parish church in Gloucestershire

Coordinates: 51°50′18.5″N 2°34′34″W

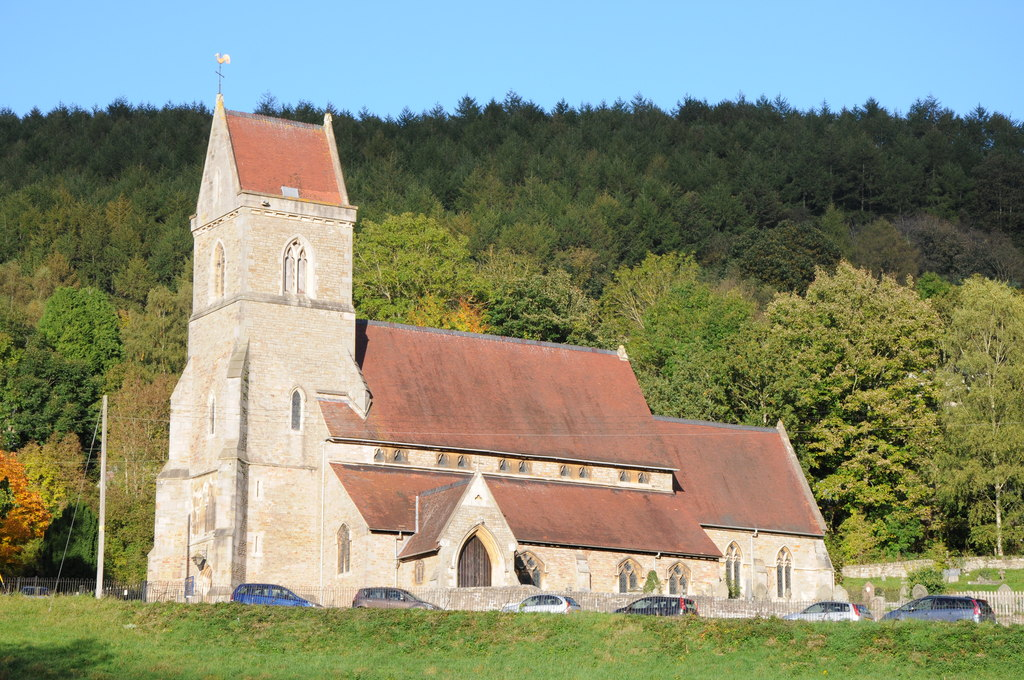
Holy Jesus Church, Lydbrook

Holy Jesus Church at Lydbrook is a Church of England parish church in the English county of Gloucestershire.

== Structure ==
The greater part of the church was built in 1850 and 1851. It is in the style of the 14th century Decorated Period. The architect was Henry Woodyer, a flamboyant character. While the church was being built, an article in Ecclesiologist (new series XLV December 1850) heavily criticised Woodyer's design. The twenty-foot length of the original pews in each aisle of the nave, with access to the secondary portion via a passage near the side walls was particularly criticised. A passage up the middle of each aisles preferred instead. The article concludes that the most objectionable feature was the two floating buttresses to the rear of the tower, "which seem to penetrate the lofty roof of the nave and lead one to expect a most substantial substructure within. But alas ! internally they are found to be corbelled off above the westernmost clerestory windows."

The interior and ornamental parts are built of Bath Stone, the exterior being of the Grit Stone of the neighbourhood. The clerestorial nave of five bays is approximately 50 feet in height, 56 feet long and 50 feet wide. The arcades are of cylindrical columns rising to pointed arches. The windows are in the Geometrical Decorated style. The roof is a unique forest of wind bracing wooden trusses. The chancel roof consists of scissors-beam trusses.

== Tower ==
The tower of the church is 80 feet in height, the saddle back roof being an unusual feature for the forest, but quite common elsewhere in Gloucestershire, such as St Margaret's, Bagendon.

== East window and the Thomas family ==
Lydbrook Church East Window © Dr Michael Foster 1991

The east window commemorates the Thomas family famous for its national industrial achievements in the founding of the South Wales Steel Industry, and having begun in a modest way at the Lydbrook Tin Works. The window depicts the four evangelists - Matthew, Mark, Luke and John, with Christ the King at the centre. Below each of the Evangelists is an angel holding a shield portraying the Evangelist's symbol. Below Christ are two angels holding a shield bearing his name (IHS = JES). Above the risen Christ is the Holy Spirit in the form of a dove radiating down. To each side of the dove is an angel, respectively holding shields bearing the initials alpha and omega. Originally the window was provided by Richard and Ann Thomas in memory of their children. The original inscription on the brass plaque ran "To the Glory of God, and in memory of the following members of the Thomas Family - William George, Sydney Lovelock and Ann Lillian, who rest in this Churchyard, Samuel Treherne and Alfred Ivor, interred at Lantwit, Neath, and Stanley Rendell, interred at the English Cemetery, Rome". The window was dedicated 20 October 1908 by the Bishop of Gloucester. Sometime after 1917, with the deaths of Richard (1916) and Ann Thomas (1914), and Richard Beaumont and Elizabeth Mabel their children, a new plaque replaced the original with the additional names.

The stained glass window at the east end of the south aisle is in memory of the Reverend Henry Hoitt and was given by his wife in 1911. Hoitt had served as vicar for forty-two years. To complement this window an altar (The Lady Altar) was placed underneath, with plans to screen it off, in effect to form a Lady Chapel. However the screen was never put in place. The eagle lectern also in memory of Henry Hoitt was added in 1909 replacing an earlier, simpler lectern.

The sedilia in the south wall of the sanctuary are worth noticing for the delicate stone traceried rere-arch above them. Behind the altar lies some attractive stone carving.

== Memorials ==
Only three stone memorials adorn the walls of the Church. First is the war memorial by the Lady Chapel Altar. Second is a memorial to Caroline Hodges (d. 1920) who was for thirty-six years a nurse in Lydbrook. The memorial is placed by the font, where many of the babies she delivered were baptised. The third memorial is to Jack Priest (d. 1983) who was a member of the choir and a churchwarden.

The war memorial was erected in two stages. The right and left tablets stood together to commemorate those who gave their lives in the Great War. The larger middle tablet was added after the Second World War.

A brass plate mounted on the wall below the Lady Altar window (itself dedicated to the Reverend H. T. Hoitt) commemorates Annie Mabel Hoitt his daughter and benefactress of the church (d. 1967). A record of various gifts is recorded in a frame mounted in the Sanctuary.

== Churchyard ==
The churchyard contains war graves of four soldiers of World War I.

== Church plate ==
The church's silver consists of a chalice, paten and flagon, made by silversmith John Keith in 1850 to Butterfield's design, and the presently used chalice and paten given in memory of Dorothy Joan Harris by her family.

== Book of Remembrance ==
On permanent display in the church is a Book of Remembrance. Details of entry of names can be gained from the churchwardens. The display cabinet was made by a local craftsman, Laddy Broadman.

== Chronology ==
- The church was restored in 1904 under the architect M. H. Medland.
- The east window was added in 1908.
- The eagle lectern was introduced in 1909.
- The south aisle east stained glass window and Lady Altar added 1911.
- The organ once stood where the war memorial stands today, but was moved in 1912 when further extensions to the church were added by the architect A. H. Pearson; an organ chamber continuing the south aisle eastwards and a choir vestry on the north side complementing the south porch.
- The font originally stood on the left hand side of the south porch entrance but in 1911 it was moved to the present position on the right hand side at the back of the south aisle.

Further activity took place in the 1960s and 1970s

- The original wooden choir screen stood between the chancel and the nave, it had to be removed in 1966 because of woodworm. The overall effect was to open up the church, bringing together the priest, choir and congregation.
- In 1964 the first four pews in the north aisle (half pews) were removed to allow room for children's work, as by that time the church schoolrooms were dilapidated and unable to be used.
- The Lady Altar was refurbished by the Reverend David Lovell and Mrs. Lovell in 1971.

Under the guidance of the vicar, the Reverend Michael Foster, from 1991 until 1993 major restoration and alterations made the building serviceable for community activities under the direction of the Architect, John Sparrow;

- Lead valleys on the roof were repaired, and the string course on the tower was replaced, in addition to weathered stone on the tower.
- In January 1991 a water supply was brought into church, a milestone followed by the installation of toilets in March 1992 and a kitchen unit using the choir vestry.
- In March 1992 the four back rows of pews were removed and replaced by wooden chairs with cushioned seats and backs. This allowed space for community activities to begin to develop.
- In 1993, the hot water heating system was upgraded with the addition of convector fan radiators, and an upgraded boiler greatly increasing the wattage output.
- The removal of the remaining nine rows of pews followed in July 1993. 250 comfortable chairs now grace the Church. The visual effect has been to make the church look brighter and larger.
- Since the building of the church in 1851, the south porch had been an external entrance and represented a covered approach to the church. In June 1992 external doors were fitted to the Porch creating a further small meeting room. The tiled floor to the Porch had been pitted by the weather, and this was restored.

== Vicars of Lydbrook ==
- 1851 - William Deering
- 1852 - Temple H. Chase
- 1866 - Henry T. Hoitt
- 1908 - Fredereck W. Bidwell
- 1912 - Geoffrey A. Hopkins
- 1926 - Henry Thompson
- 1933 - Reginald W. E. Robinson
- 1942 - Bert Prime
- 1951 - Reginald F. Hibbs
- 1961 - (Priest-in-Charge) Eric J. Hoskin
- 1963 - Ernest Rutter
- 1964 - John C. Wilson
- 1967 - David J. Lovell
- 1973 - Wilfred D. Varney
- 1977 - Dennis Bowler
- 1982 - W. A. Stuart Parker
- 1989 - Michael J. Foster

The Reverend Michael Foster (Fr Michael) was the last Vicar of Lydbrook, which was served by Priests in Charge to 2006, when the parish was merged with Ruardean and Drybrook under the new incumbency of Nicholas Robert Bromfield.
