= Seven Sisters (Quantock Hills) =

Coordinates: 51°05′15″N 03°09′22″W

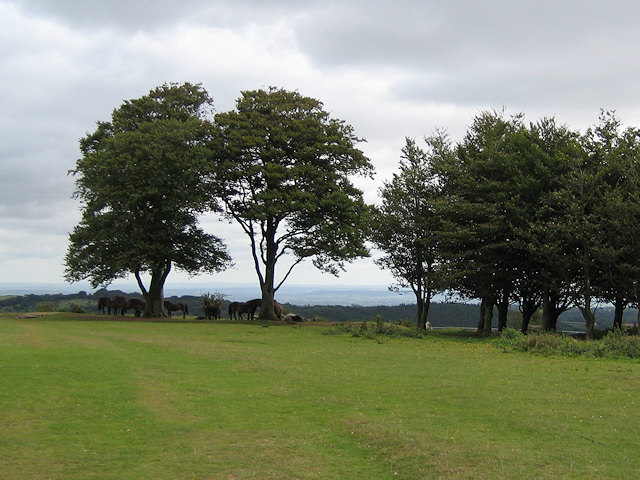
The Seven Sisters; the three remaining original trees to the left, with 1970s replacements to the right

The Seven Sisters is a clump of beech trees on Cothelstone Hill in the Quantock Hills, England. Originally planted in the 18th century, they form a well-known and prominent landmark visible from large areas of Somerset and South Wales. The hill is currently leased to the South West Heritage Trust by its owner Somerset County Council, and managed by the Quantock Hills AONB Service under a Higher Level Stewardship Scheme. Three large trees remain from the original planting, while recently planted replacements grow nearby.

== History ==
The trees are sited on a Bronze Age disc barrow near the summit of Cothelstone Hill. They are thought to have originally been planted by Mary Hill, Lady Hillsborough (1726-1780) in the later 18th century; Hill also planted two other circles of beeches in the area and built an ornamental folly, Cothelstone Beacon or Beacon Tower, nearby. A newspaper article of the time referred to "Cotherston, the place in Somersetshire, where lady Hilsborough has lately raised a small structure for the purpose of prospect, is so much prized for its situation that several gentlemen of the county offered, if her ladyship would have given her consent, to have subscribed £2,000 and laid out the money in a building more conspicuous".

Originally a clump of 15 trees, over time they were reduced to seven and, known as the "Seven Sisters", became a well-known landmark. Similar hilltop groves of beeches, or tree rings, are a common feature of 18th and 19th century landscape planting; other well-known examples include Wittenham Clumps.

Beacon Tower was largely destroyed during a storm in 1910 and only a few stones now remain. As the trees were approaching the end of their lives, in the 1970s a new clump of seven beeches was planted immediately to the south-west: several of the originals fell in gales in the early 2000s. By 2014, English Heritage determined that the 1970s planting was potentially causing damage to underlying archaeology and stated that the newer trees would be felled, leading to a local campaign to retain them. After representations by Friends of Quantock and preparation of a planting scheme, additional trees were planted in late 2015 to ensure continuation of the landmark.
