= Tree ring (landscape feature) =

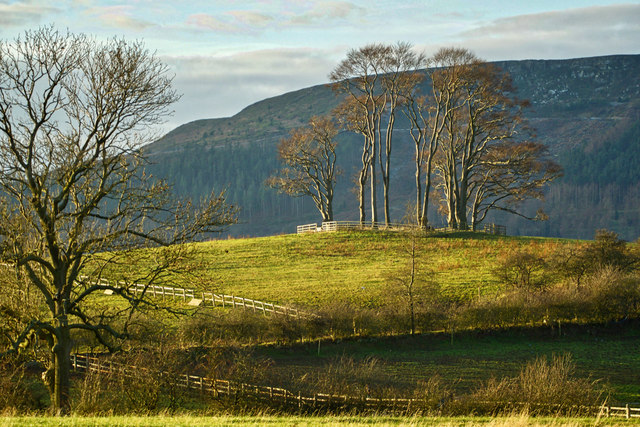
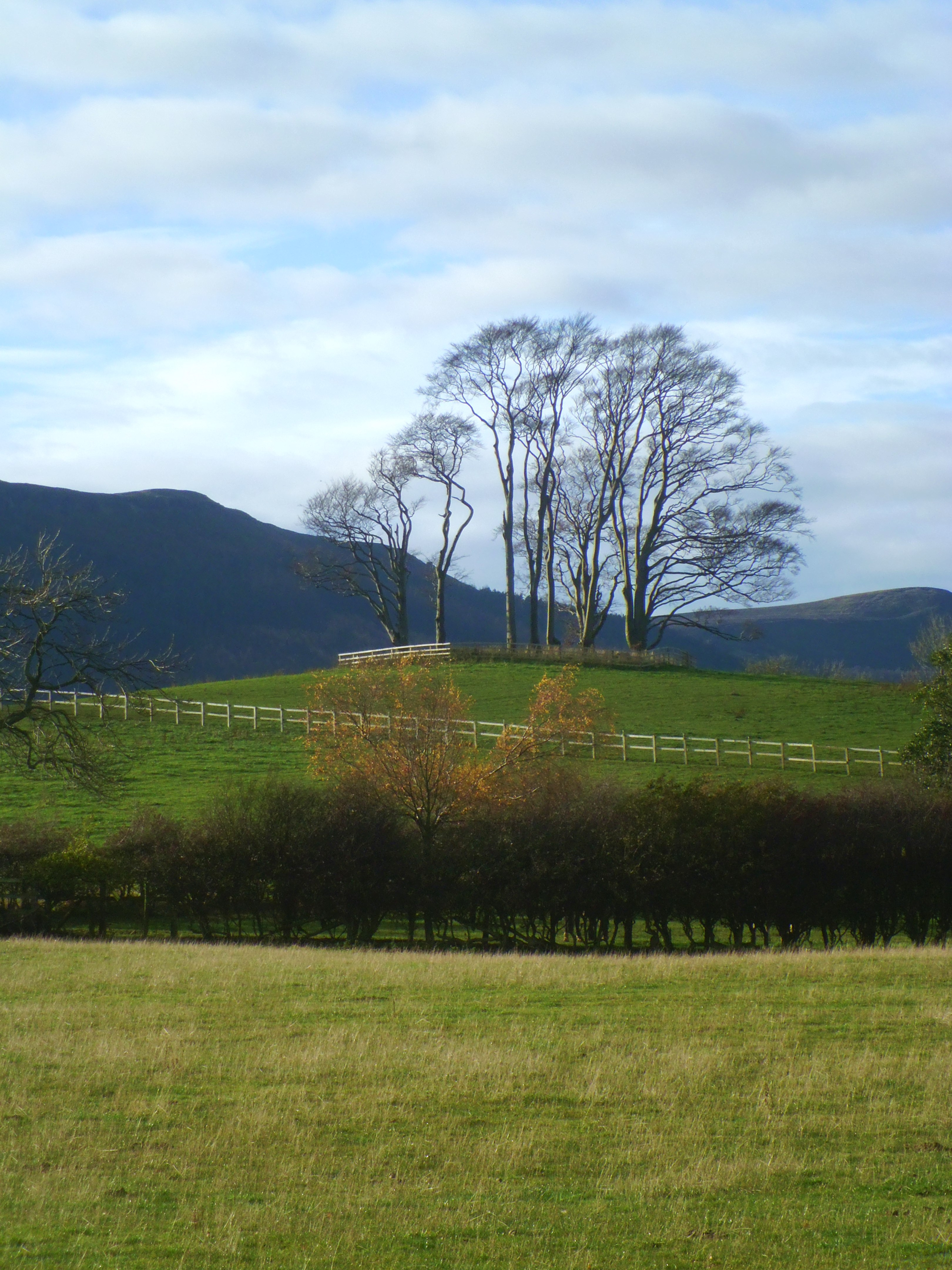
The Folly, How Hill, Ingleby Greenhow, a typical tree ring of beeches planted to enhance an existing landscape feature.

A tree ring, also once popularly called a "folly", is a decorative feature of 18th and early 19th century planned landscapes in Britain and Ireland, comprising a circular earthen enclosure (a "tree ring enclosure") planted with trees. While several different species of tree were used, beech and Scots pine were especially popular for their tall, straight growth and landscape value. Tree rings are a development of the naturalistic 18th century style of landscape architecture.

== History and construction ==
Tree rings were created by 18th century landowners seeking to 'improve' and enhance the views across their properties. Beech became particularly valued in the 18th century as a landscape tree and for its timber, where previously it had been largely regarded as a fuel source and often managed by coppicing. Hilltop groves of beech trees were especially favoured; several well-known examples survive in the South of England, including Wittenham Clumps, the earliest such planting in England, dating from 1740.

Creation of a tree ring involved raising a circular hedge bank: this was planted with quickset to provide a fast-growing, thorny barrier to protect the young trees from livestock. The term "tree ring enclosure" is generally used to describe the resulting bank, while "tree ring" is used to refer to the trees themselves; in some cases an existing manmade feature such as a barrow or motte was used. While the outer ring of trees often featured beeches, in the 19th century the interior of tree rings was often planted with ornamental conifers.

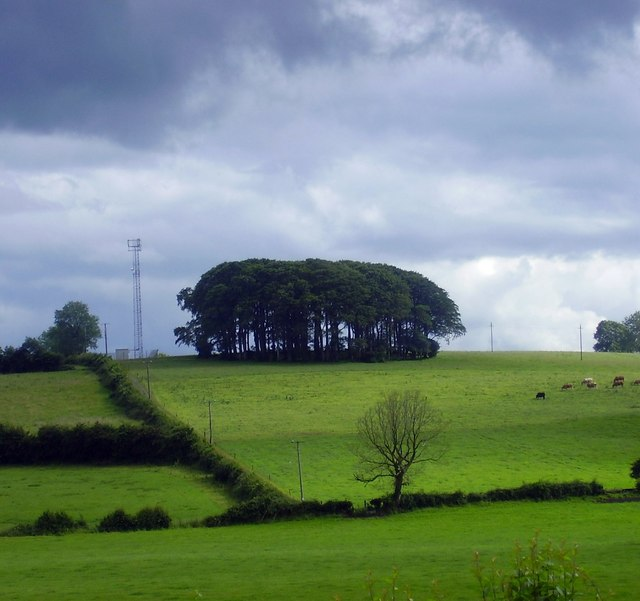
Beech tree ring near Daingean, County Offaly, originally planted by the Lucas family of Mount Lucas

In Ireland, tree rings were often planted as a landscape embellishment on top of drumlins, and occasionally made use of an existing rath or ringfort by creation of a small additional bank. The species used were similar to those in England, with a high proportion of beech and Scots pine, with smaller numbers of ash, oak, sycamore and other trees. In the late 18th century the Dublin Society offered a premium, at two shillings a perch running measure, for enclosing or tree planting on "old Danish forts, mounds, raths and moats".

== Present status ==
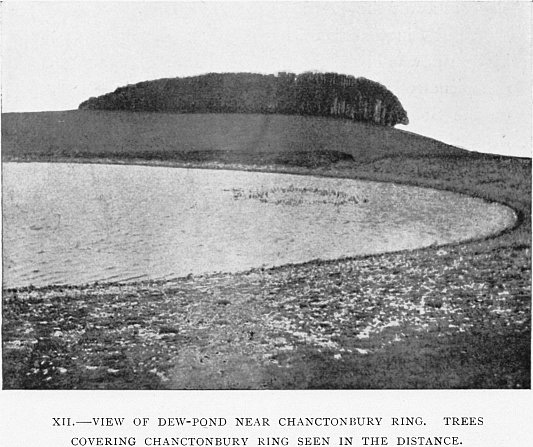
Chanctonbury Ring, seen in 1905: its appearance was greatly altered by a 1987 storm

The relatively short lifespan of beeches means that tree rings are becoming vulnerable to damage or loss. Chanctonbury Ring was heavily damaged by the Great Storm of 1987, losing about 75% of its trees. Many of the beech trees at Wittenham Clumps are reaching the end of their life; the Earth Trust, which manages the site, is replanting with more drought-resistant hornbeam and lime.

== Examples ==
- Chanctonbury Ring, Sussex, 1760
- Lancing Ring, Sussex, late 18th century
- Wittenham Clumps, Berkshire, c.1740
- Seven Sisters, Somerset, c.1780
- Wayland's Smithy, Oxfordshire, planted with beech and fir trees in c.1810 and for a time known as "Wayland's Folly"
