= Chanctonbury Ring =

Hill fort in West Sussex, England

Coordinates: 50.89626°N 0.38177°W

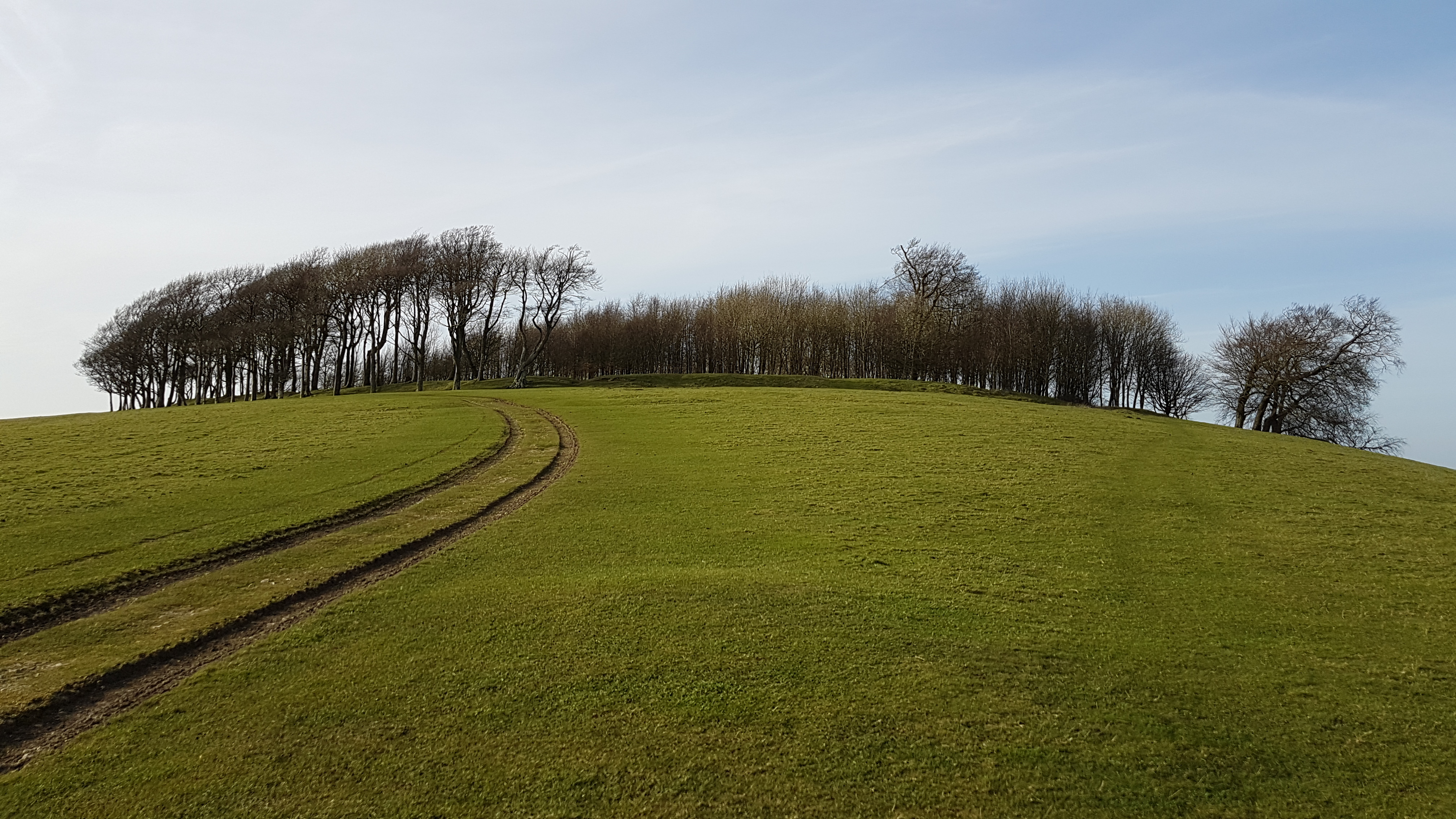
- Chanctonbury Ring, March 2017

Highest point
- Elevation: 242 m (794 ft)
- Prominence: 215 m (705 ft)
- Parent peak: Leith Hill
- Listing: Marilyn

Geography
- Location: South Downs, England
- OS grid: TQ139120
- Topo map: OS Landranger 198

Chanctonbury Ring is a prehistoric hill fort atop Chanctonbury Hill on the South Downs, on the border of the civil parishes of Washington and Wiston in the English county of West Sussex. A ridgeway, now part of the South Downs Way, runs along the hill. It forms part of an ensemble of associated historical features created over a span of more than 2,000 years, including round barrows dating from the Bronze Age to the Saxon periods and dykes dating from the Iron Age and Roman periods.

Consisting of a roughly circular low earthen rampart surrounded by a ditch, Chanctonbury Ring is thought to date to the late Bronze Age or early Iron Age. The purpose of the structure is unknown but it could have filled a variety of roles, including a defensive position, a cattle enclosure or even a religious shrine. After a few centuries of usage, it was abandoned for about five hundred years until it was reoccupied during the Roman period. Two Romano-British temples were built in the hill fort's interior, one of which may have been dedicated to a boar cult.

After its final abandonment around the late fourth century AD, the hill fort remained unoccupied save for grazing cattle until a mid-18th-century landowner planted a ring of beech trees around its perimeter to beautify the site. They became a famous local landmark until largely being destroyed in the Great Storm of 1987. Periodic replanting on a number of occasions to replace old or destroyed trees has afforded archaeologists the opportunity to carry out a series of excavations which have revealed much about the history of the site.

== Description ==
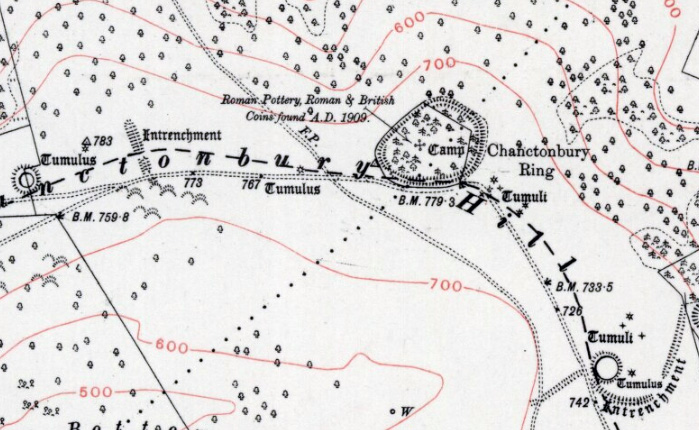
Map of Chanctonbury Ring and neighbouring archaeological features

Chanctonbury Ring is in a commanding position looking across the Sussex Weald to the north, on the edge of a steep natural escarpment to the northwest and northeast. It is at the middle point of a long, narrow and otherwise treeless plateau, approached via ridges to the east and west. A trig point is located about 400 metres (440 yd) west of the Ring, recorded by the Ordnance Survey as 238 metres (781 ft) above sea level. Although this was originally recorded as the top of Chanctonbury Hill and thus the Marilyn summit, recent measurements suggest that the area of the Ring is higher, about 241 metres (791 ft) above sea level. The Ring lies just to the north of an ancient ridgeway which has been in use since prehistoric times and is now part of the South Downs Way.

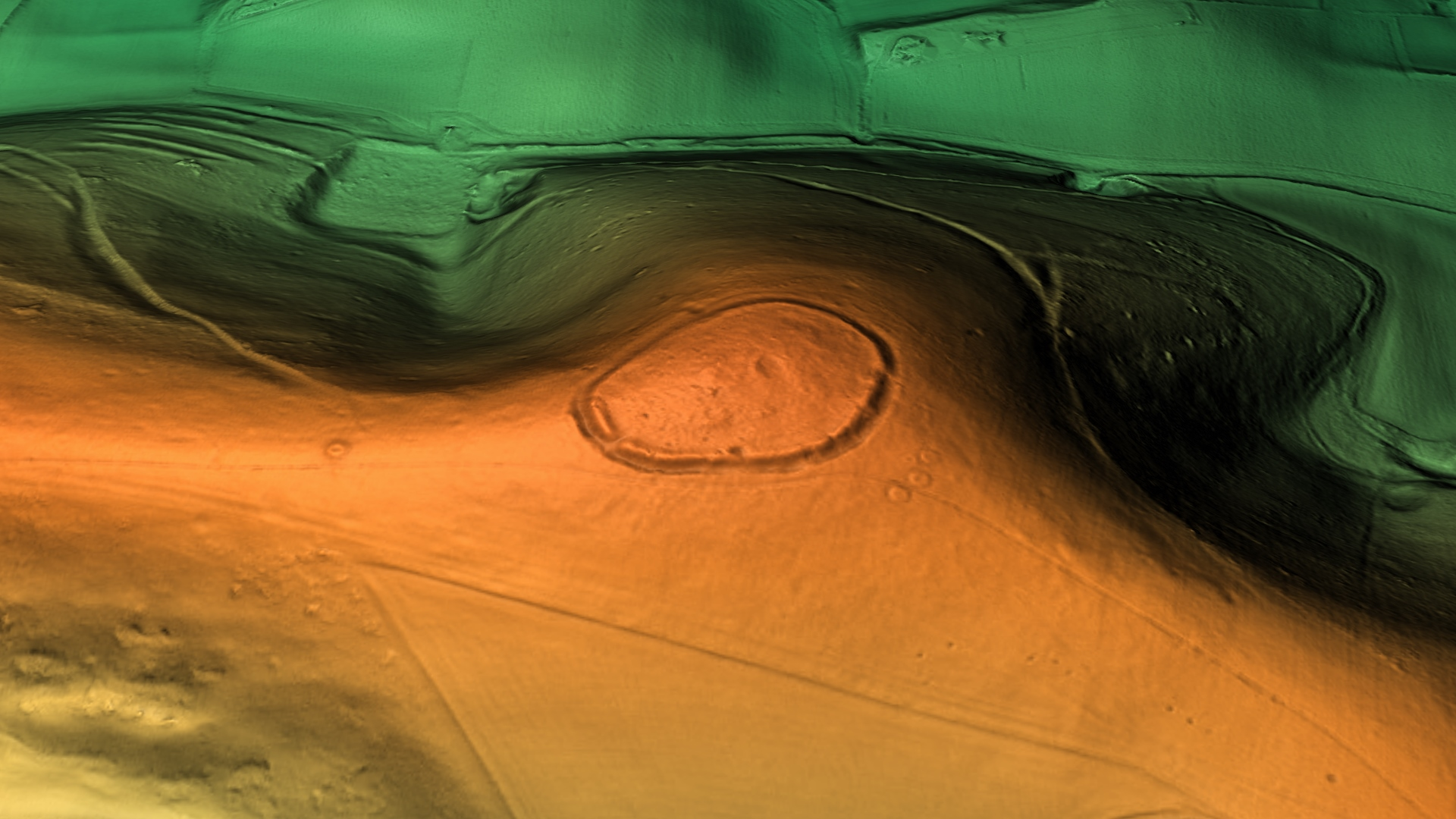
3D view of the digital terrain model

The hill fort is roughly circular, enclosing about 1.5 hectares (3.7 acres). The bank around the enclosure is about 10 metres (33 ft) wide and up to 0.8 metres (2 ft 7 in) high, with a circumference of about 400 metres (1,300 ft). It is surrounded by a ditch approximately 8 metres (26 ft) wide and 0.7 metres (2 ft 4 in) deep. The bank was constructed from chalk rubble, flint and clay excavated from its surrounding ditch. They would originally have been much wider and deeper, and would have had prominent lines of sight to other prehistoric landmarks in the area. The fort is defined by archaeologists as a "slight univallate hill fort", indicating a single-walled earthwork with a low rampart.

The original entrance to the hill fort was provided by a gap of approximately 6 metres (20 ft) on the south-eastern side, where the remains of a causeway are visible. Another gap through the rampart is visible on the south-western side but was probably created much later after the hill fort had gone out of use, as no causeway is visible there. The rampart and outer ditch have largely been preserved on the southern side, though slightly damaged by two small quarries dug into it. Erosion and soil creep have reduced the earthworks on the northern side and only traces remain of the ditch in this area. The perimeter and interior of the hill fort are occupied by a planted stand of beech trees.

== History ==
=== Origins ===
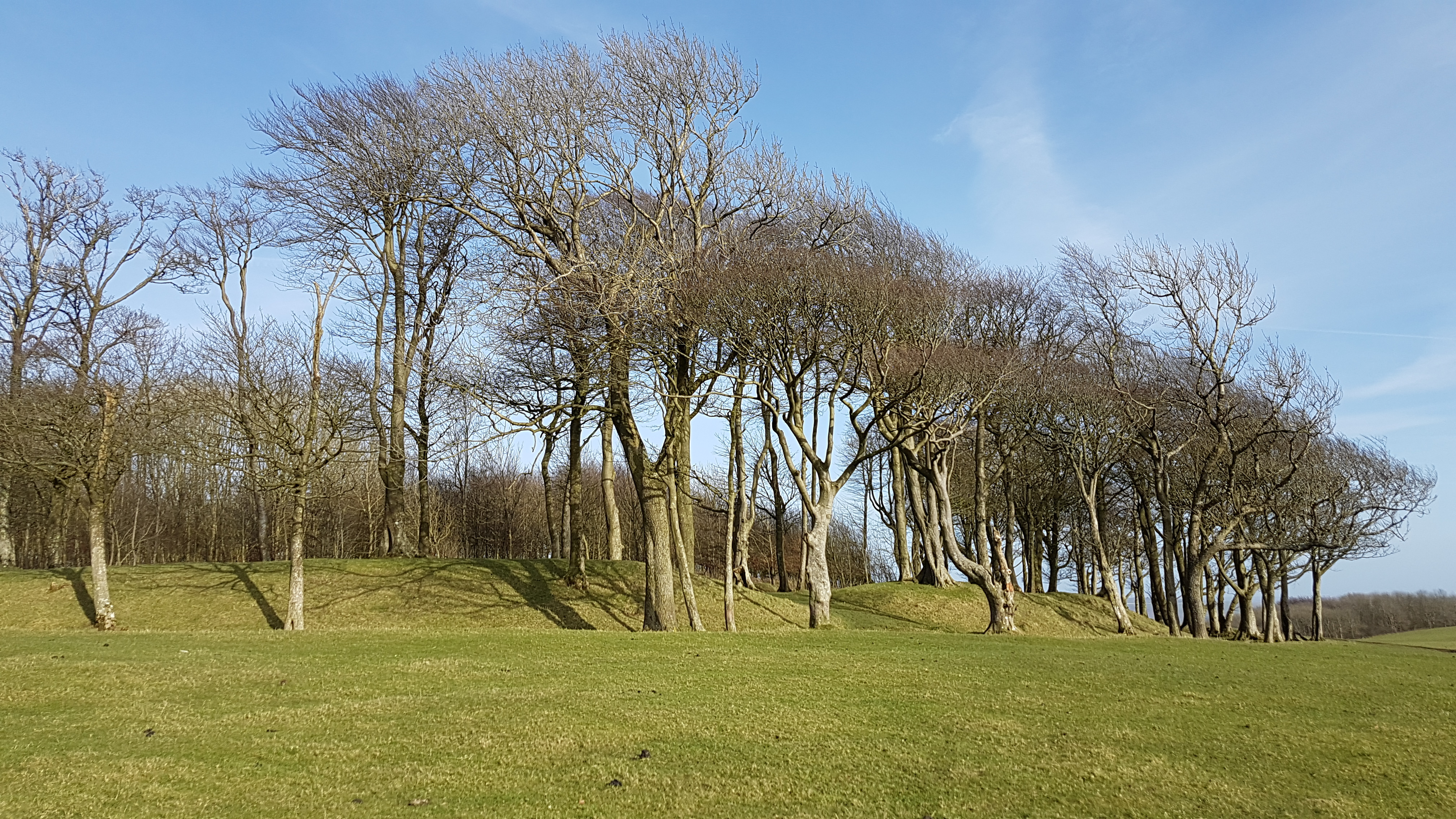
View of the south-west quadrant of Chanctonbury Ring, showing the bank and south-western entrance (not part of the original structure)

Chanctonbury Ring was investigated by archeologists in excavations carried out in 1869, 1909, 1977 and 1988–91. Evidence for human activity in the Neolithic and early Bronze Age has been found, but not settlement or occupation. The finds consisted of tools likely to have been used for exploiting woodland. The construction of a number of barrows on the top of Chanctonbury Hill suggests that the hilltop was seen as an area of special significance, perhaps because of its high visibility. It is conceivable that the domed summit now occupied by Chanctonbury Ring was used as a site for ritual activity on account of its prominent position along the South Downs ridgeway. If so, it is conceivable that the stone tools found on the site, pre-dating the hill fort, may have been intended as ritual depositions.

The hill fort was initially thought to have been built and initially occupied during the Early Iron Age, around the sixth to the fourth centuries BC. Dating evidence was provided by pottery shards and refuse pits; an animal bone found on the site was dated through radiocarbon dating to around 370 BC. However, later analysis of pottery finds suggests that its origins are significantly older and may date to the late Bronze Age, or around the seventh century BC.

Chanctonbury Ring appears to have been abandoned some time around the mid-fourth century BC, but was possibly in only intermittent usage before then. The reason for its abandonment is unknown but might be linked to the construction of the much larger hill fort at Cissbury Ring a few miles away, which may have taken over some of the functions of the much older Chanctonbury Ring.

The site's original purpose is unclear. Despite the martial connotations of the term "hill fort", such places were used for a wide variety of purposes, including "stock enclosures, redistribution centres, places of refuge and permanent settlements". Structures were often erected within their perimeter, such as houses, storage pits and probably raised granaries. However, archaeological evidence is lacking for the existence of such structures within Chanctonbury Ring, which would have been in an extremely exposed and windswept spot. One possibility is that it may have been used as a centre for religious activity.

=== Roman temples ===
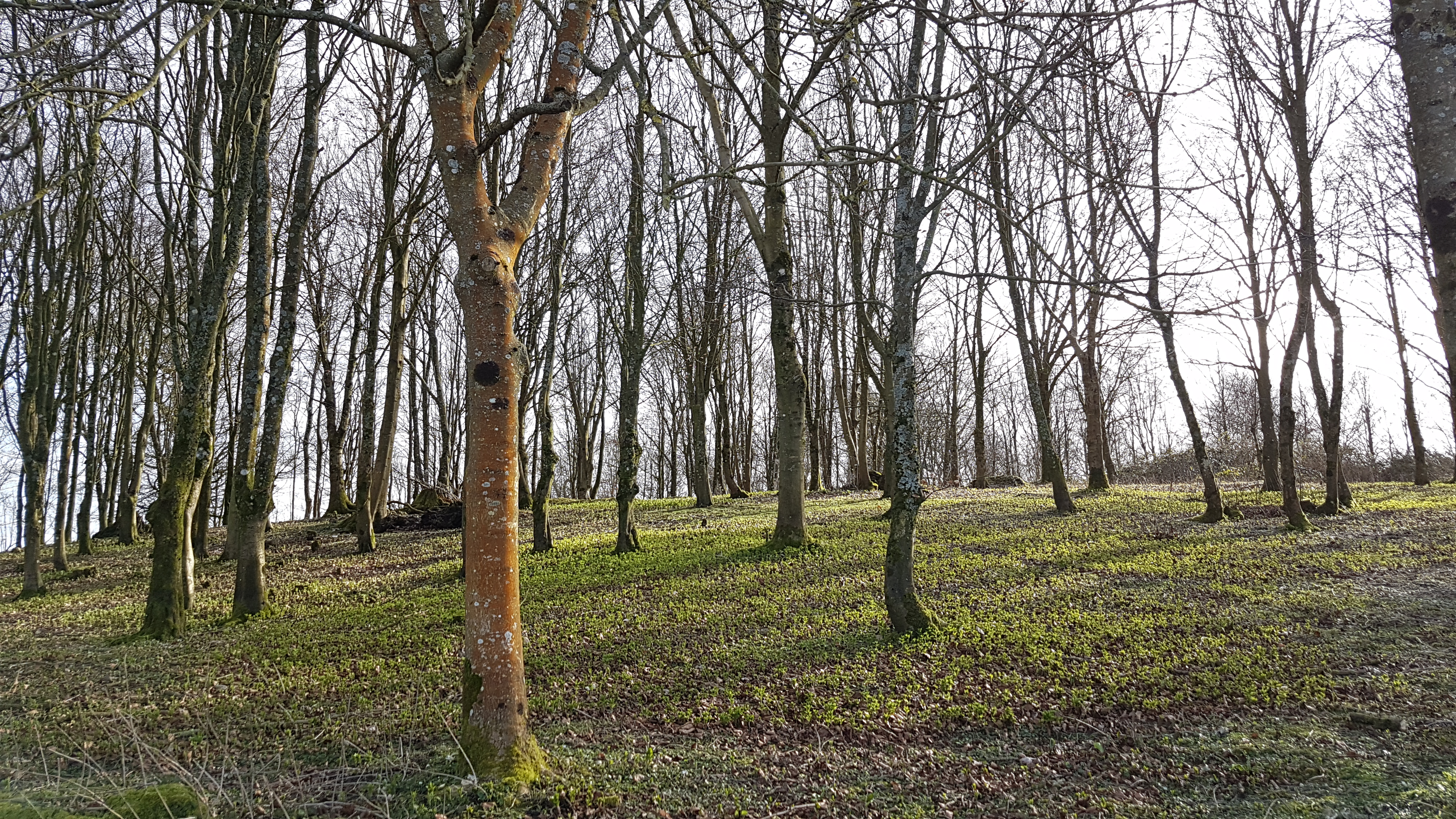
View of the interior of Chanctonbury Ring, where the remains of two Roman temples are located a short distance below the surface

Around five hundred years after its initial abandonment, Chanctonbury Ring was reused as a religious site from the mid-first century AD. At least two Romano-Celtic temples were built in the interior, probably some time during the second century, while the bank and ditch were reused to form a temenos or "sacred precinct". The remains of the temples survive principally as buried wall footings of mortared flint rubble. They are located only a few centimetres below the ground but are not visible on the surface. Mosaic fragments from Chanctonbury Ring can be found at the Horsham Museum.

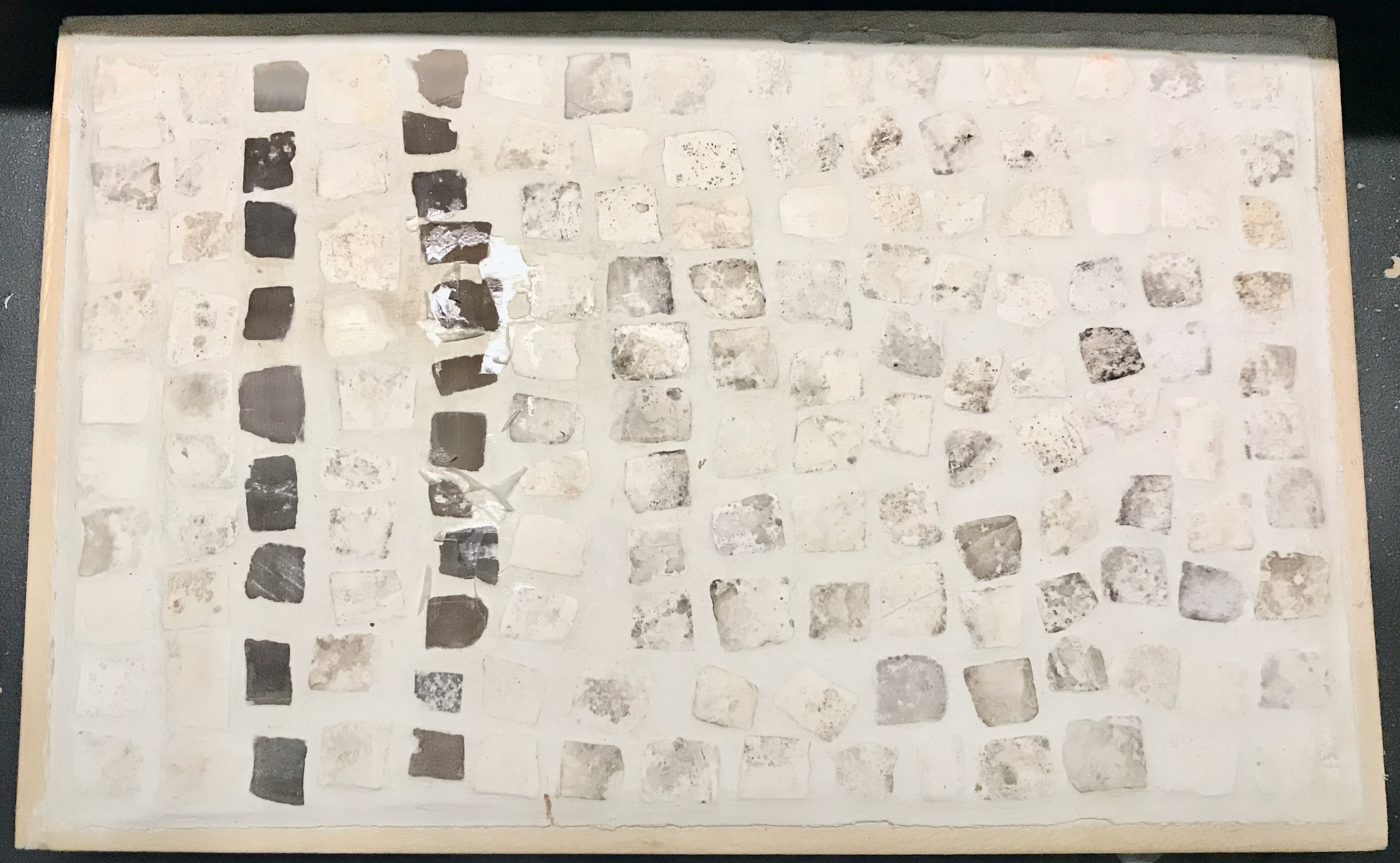
Mosaic fragments set in plaster from the temple at Chanctonbury Ring

The larger of the two known temples was constructed on a west–east alignment in the centre of the fort, at the highest point on the site. It had a "rectangular central cella or inner chamber" measuring about 9 metres (30 ft) by 7 metres (23 ft). An ambulatory or enclosed covered walkway enclosed it on the west, north and east sides, and was paved with a "rammed chalk floor" around 3 metres (9.8 ft) wide. The ambulatory's external wall was covered with red-painted plaster. The building was entered from the east, aligning it with the original entrance to the hill fort.

A small rectangular structure stood about 5 metres (16 ft) from the north-east corner of temple. Constructed on a NNE-SSW axis, it measured about 3 metres (9.8 ft) by 1 metre (3 ft 3 in). This has been interpreted as an oven or furnace. A large circular rubbish pit was constructed nearby. It has provided a variety of datable finds, including roof tile fragments, "window glass, oyster shells, pottery sherds and coins", analysis of which has shown that the temple was in use during an approximately 350-year-long period from the mid-first to the late fourth centuries AD. It is not known which deity the temple was dedicated to.

A second temple was located around 30 metres (98 ft) southwest of the first. Its remains are much more fragmentary as it appears to have been dismantled after falling out of use. It appears to have had a polygonal shape, measuring about 8 metres (26 ft) on each side, with a rectangular annexe on the eastern side which had a floor made of tessellated greensand cubes. The temple may have been dedicated to a boar cult, judging from the discovery of numerous bone fragments from the heads and jaws of pigs. A copper alloy plaque of a boar found at nearby Muntham Court Romano-British site may have been associated with the cult.

It is not known why the Roman temples were built on the site, but there are examples elsewhere of the Romans building on the site of Iron Age temples or shrines. However, it is more difficult to argue for this being the case at Chanctonbury Ring, given the gap of half a millennium between the hill fort's abandonment and reoccupation. In other locations, such as at Hayling Island and Maiden Castle, there was continuity of religious use between Iron Age and Roman times, which was clearly not the case with Chanctonbury.

The hill fort's rampart may have been refurbished when it was reoccupied, and at least one of the two nearby dykes was probably also constructed during the Roman period. The excavation of 1909 also reportedly found the remains of a "curious pear-shaped structure", but subsequent archaeological investigations have revealed no evidence of it. The site is linked via a Roman terrace way on the north face of Chanctonbury Hill to the Sussex Greensand Way, which runs parallel to the northern escarpment of the Downs.

=== 18th-century copse ===
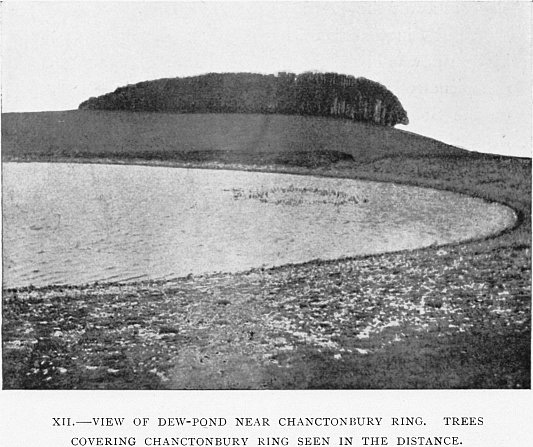
View of Chanctonbury Ring and dew pond, c. 1905

After its abandonment, Chanctonbury Ring appears to have been left unoccupied and unused throughout the late Roman, medieval and early modern periods. The site lies within the estate of the Goring family of Wiston House, who have been prominent local landowners for centuries. The ring of beech trees that gave it its fame was first planted in 1760 by Charles Goring, around and just inside the ramparts. At the age of 16, he decided to beautify the site by planting it with trees, though the interior was left open at the time. He was said to have carried water up the hill each time he visited to water his trees, though some versions of the story say that he had his footmen climb the hill each day with buckets of water. His successors have continued to replant the trees ever since and have ensured that the fort remains a prominent landmark on the crest of the South Downs.

=== 20th century ===
In 1909, the Gorings decided that they would also plant trees in the fort's interior. Large quantities of Romano-British pottery and building rubble were discovered during preparations for planting, prompting the first archaeological excavation of the hill fort. The two temples and a large number of artefacts were discovered. However, the planting has caused damage to the archaeology within the hill fort due to disturbances caused by tree roots.

Further damage was sustained through quarrying and the hill fort's use during World War II as an anti-aircraft gun position, when four gun emplacements were constructed within its perimeter. Damage was also caused by World War II training activities, including the digging of practice slit trenches and rubbish pits on the site.

Chanctonbury Ring was fenced off for a number of years after 1950 when the then owner surrounded it with barbed wire and erected a large iron water tank for cattle. This prompted controversy for blocking rights of way and harming the view, and was eventually removed. In 1977, the Goring estate set about replanting areas of the ring to replace trees which were at the end of their natural lifespan. This provided West Sussex County Council with an opportunity to carry out a further archaeological investigation of the site, which was accomplished during July and August of that year.

The Great Storm of 1987 destroyed over 75% of the trees. It was decided to replant the ring and to take a fresh opportunity to investigate the ring's archaeology. Further archaeological investigations took place between 1987 and 1991 which led to a reassessment of earlier findings and a redating of the hill fort's construction to an earlier period. The replanted trees are only now beginning to restore the ring to its former glory.

== Other features in the vicinity ==
=== Archaeological sites ===
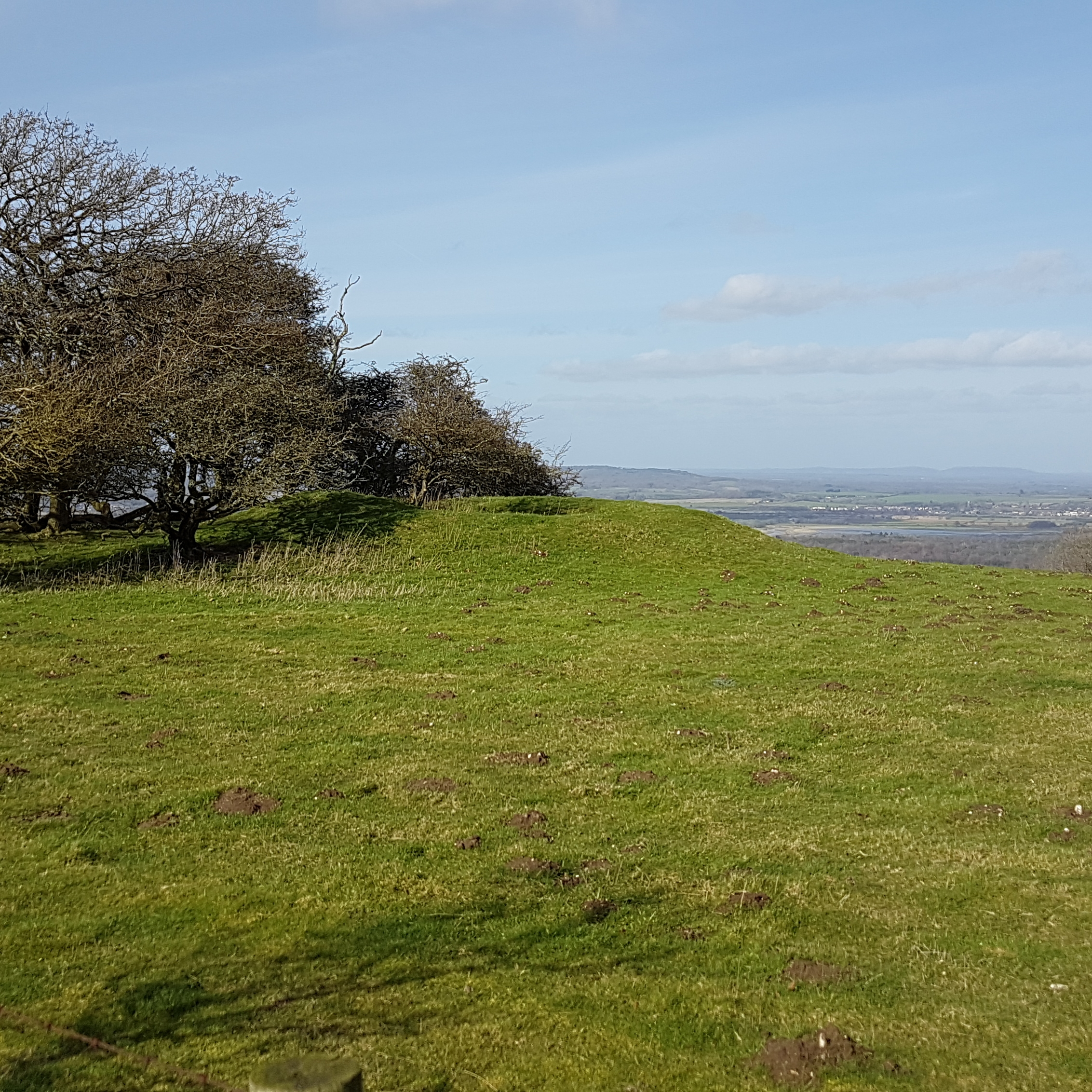
A robbed-out round barrow near Chanctonbury Ring

Chanctonbury Ring comprises part of a closely associated group of archaeological sites on Chanctonbury Hill dating from the prehistoric, Roman and medieval periods. They are protected as scheduled monuments. Around 400 metres (1,300 ft) to the west is a cross-dyke measuring 274 metres (899 ft) long with a ditch on its western side. A similar crescent-shaped cross-dyke lies about the same distance to the east. The two dykes slice across the ridge on which the fort lies and are likely to be associated with its defence. While the eastern dyke is undated, the western dyke has been dated to the Roman period and represents an unusually late example of this type of structure.

A number of prehistoric barrows of the saucer and bowl type and hlaews or Saxon barrows are located in the vicinity of the fort, indicating the importance of the hilltop as a place of sacred and ritual activity for at least 2,000 years. A well-preserved example of a bowl barrow, the commonest type of round barrow, is located 200 metres (660 ft) west of Chanctonbury Ring.

Three well-preserved saucer barrows and a pair of hlaews are located just to the south-east of Chanctonbury Ring and represent some of the rarest types of barrow, of which only a few dozen examples of each are known nationwide. The saucer barrows are undated but similar examples are known to date to between 1800-1200BC. Such barrows generally contain an inhumation or cremation burial with a few grave goods such as pottery, tools and personal accessories. Hlaews were built during Anglo-Saxon or Viking times for high-ranking individuals and consist of mounds generally built over graves dug into the soil below. The ones at Chanctonbury Ring have not yet been excavated.

There may be additional poorly preserved barrows in the vicinity of the hill fort. A topographical survey conducted by Mark Tibble has identified fourteen landscape features which may be previously unrecognised round barrows. Some barrows have certainly been lost to erosion or ploughing, as in the case of one about 400 metres (1,300 ft) further west which was excavated in the 1950s before being destroyed. It was found to contain the skeletons of an adult female and a child and fragmentary remains of a third individual, as well as a fine example of an early Bronze Age Wessex culture dagger dating to around 1800–1500 BC. The barrows around Chanctonbury Fort usually have a depression in their centre, indicating that they were robbed at some point; medieval pottery found in the destroyed barrow suggests that this took place, at least in that case, in the Middle Ages. Archaeologists have discovered very little in the other barrows, presumably due to grave-robbers.

=== Dew pond ===
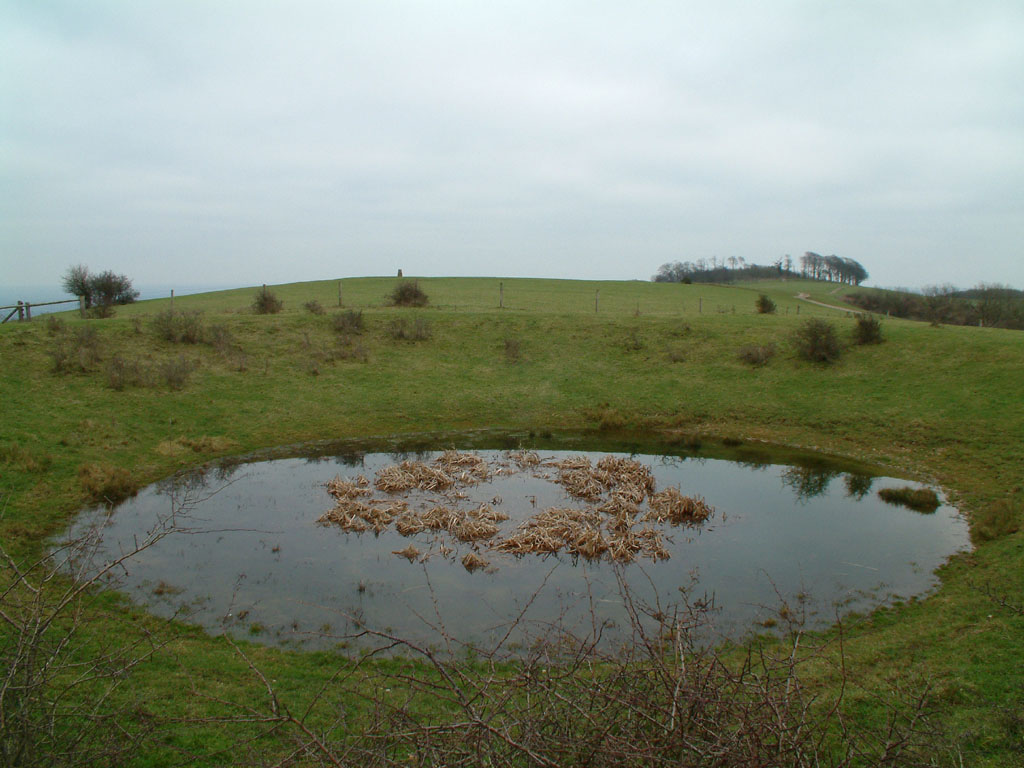
Chanctonbury Dew Pond with the Ring behind

Near the trig point is Chanctonbury Dew Pond, a Site of Special Scientific Interest. Constructed about 1870, it was restored by the Sussex Society of Downsmen in 1970, and is maintained by them.

== Legends ==
Local legend has it that Chanctonbury Ring was created by the Devil and that he can be summoned by running around the clump of trees seven times anti-clockwise. When he appears he will offer the summoner a bowl of soup in exchange for their soul. Frank R. Williams, writing in the Sussex Notes and Queries in 1944, argues that the story derives from ancient pagan worship which would include a ritual dance ceremony followed by a sacrificial feast. The association with Chanctonbury derives from an earlier pagan site on the land. The story is widely known orally with variations (such as the Devil offering porridge or milk instead of soup) but may be of relatively recent origins, with its first known appearance in print dating to Arthur Beckett's 1909 book The Spirit of the Downs.

The occultists Aleister Crowley and his associate Victor Neuburg, who lived in Steyning two miles away from Chanctonbury Ring, were reportedly convinced that the site was a "place of power" for its pre-Christian religious significance. It is unclear whether they actually visited it, but Neuberg published poems about the supposed mystic power of the site and imagined gruesome Druidic sacrifices taking place there.

In his 2013 travelogue The Old Ways: A Journey on Foot, Robert Macfarlane gives an account of an unsettling experience sleeping out on Chanctonbury Ring one summer night, during which he is woken by unearthly screaming at 2 am.

The Ring is also claimed to increase fertility in women who sleep underneath the trees for one night.

== Access ==
There are two car parks at the base of the hill: to the north-east on Chanctonbury Ring Road off the A283 Washington Road, and to the west on Washington Bostal just off the A24 road. The hill is located just off the South Downs Way and enjoys extensive views to the north.

== In popular culture ==
The ring features, along with the nearby town of Steyning (Starring in the book, the main protagonist attends a fictional girls' high school there), in the 1925 girls' school story Katharine Goes to School, by Winifred Darch. Chanctonbury serves as an atmospheric meeting place, and there is some mention of the legends surrounding it.

The album Chanctonbury Rings by Justin Hopper, Sharron Kraus and Belbury Poly, released on Ghost Box Records in 2019, contains prose and poetry detailing the geography and legends relating to the rings and its environs.

The ring and immediate area are the setting for The Sussex Downs Murder (1936) by John Bude and reprinted in the British Library Crime Classics.

The 2014 Album Tamatebako by Brighton-based band Cuz features a song The Wheel and the Ring which directly references Chanctonbury Ring.

Mervyn Stockwood, sometime Bishop of Southwark, subtitled his 1983 autobiography Chanctonbury Ring.
