= Dew pond =

Artificial pond for watering livestock

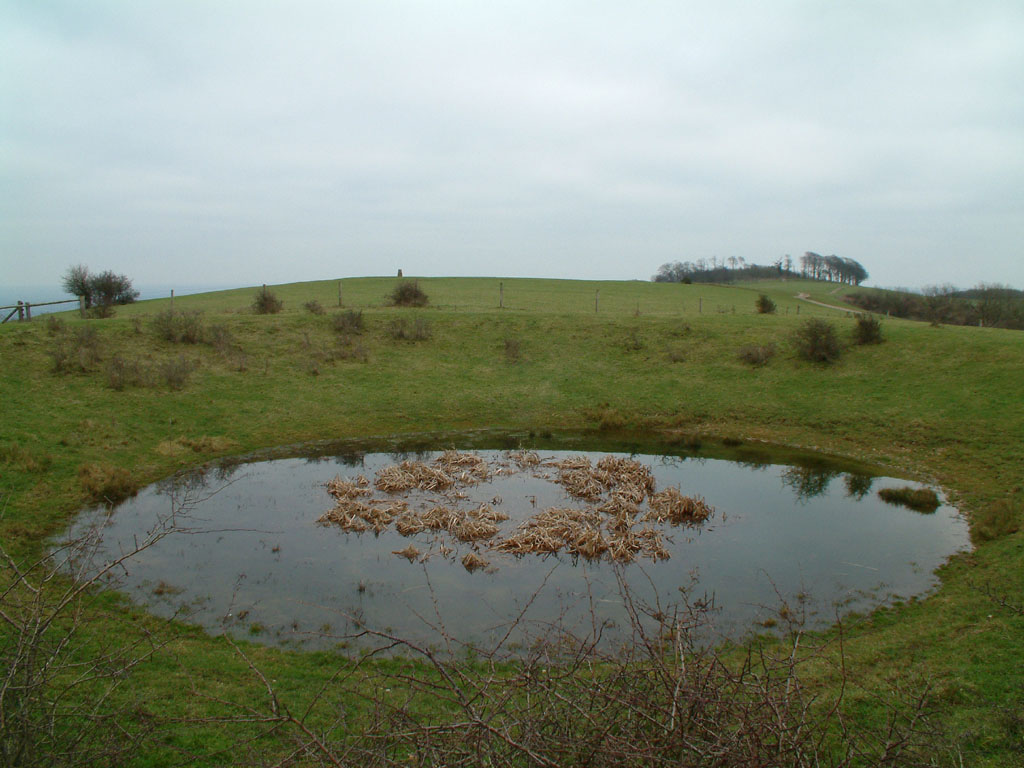
Typical example of downland dew pond near Chanctonbury Ring, West Sussex. 50°53′47″N 0°23′23″W

A dew pond (sometimes cloud pond or mist pond) is an artificial pond usually sited on the top of a hill, intended for watering livestock. Dew ponds are used in areas where a natural supply of surface water may not be readily available. The name dew pond is first found in the Journal of the Royal Agricultural Society in 1865. Despite the name, their primary source of water is believed to be rainfall rather than dew or mist.

== Construction ==
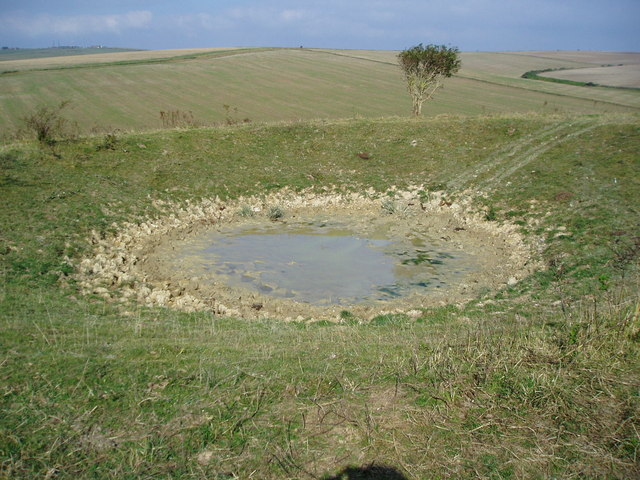
Dew pond at Cockroost Hill, parish of Portslade, Sussex, showing layer of chalk rubble protecting the lining 50°51′43″N 0°14′12″W

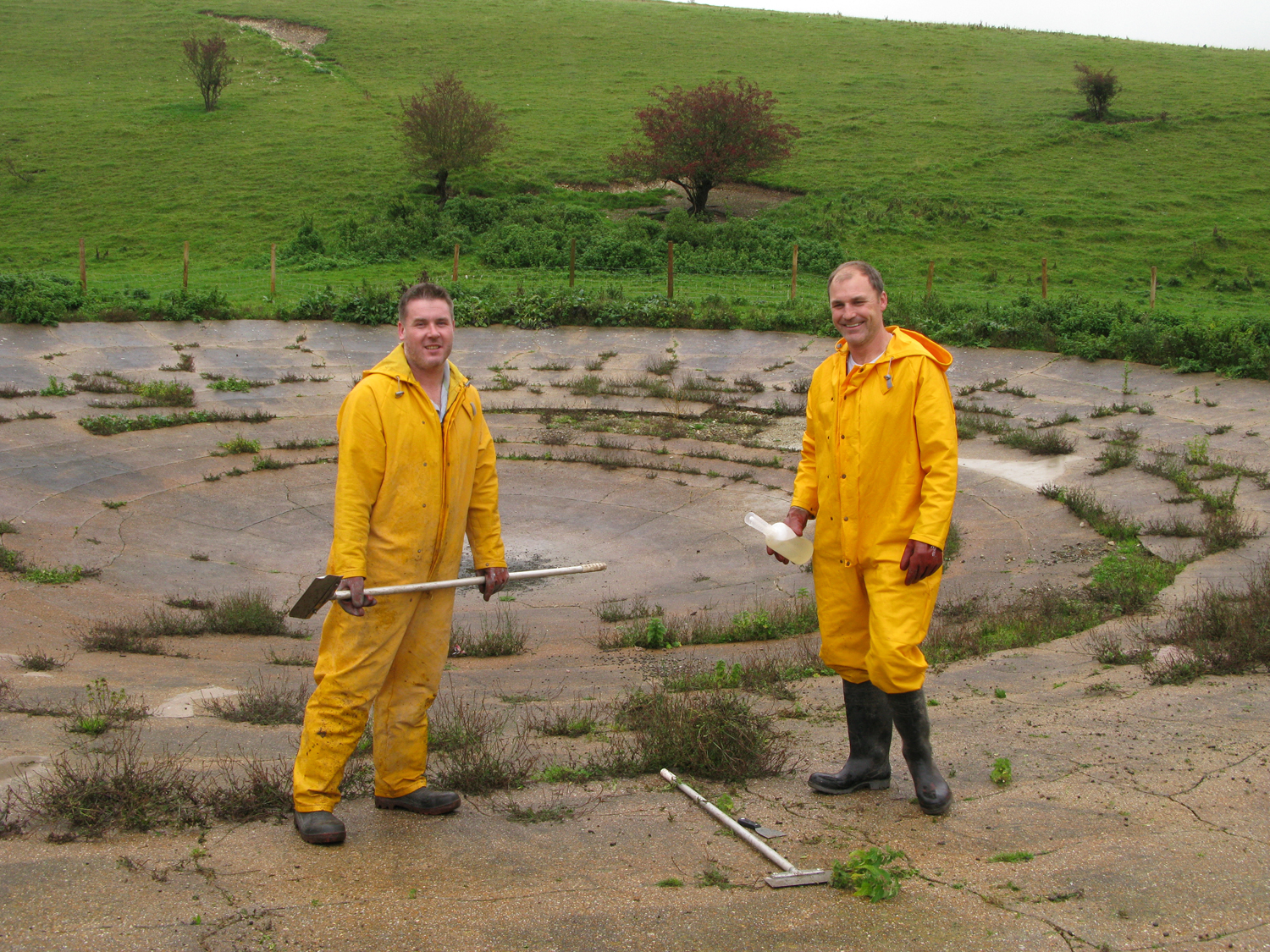
Modern examples made with portland cement need regular repair. Oxteddle Bottom, Sussex 50°52′15″N 0°02′28″E

They are usually shallow, saucer-shaped and lined with puddled clay, chalk or marl on an insulating straw layer over a bottom layer of chalk or lime. To deter earthworms from their natural tendency of burrowing upwards, which in a short while would make the clay lining porous, a layer of soot would be incorporated or lime mixed with the clay. The clay is usually covered with straw to prevent cracking by the sun and a final layer of chalk rubble or broken stone to protect the lining from the hoofs of sheep or cattle. To retain more of the rainfall, the clay layer could be extended across the catchment area of the pond. If the pond's temperature is kept low, evaporation (a major water loss) may be significantly reduced, thus maintaining the collected rainwater. According to researcher Edward Martin, this may be attained by building the pond in a hollow, where cool air is likely to gather, or by keeping the surrounding grass long to enhance heat radiation. As the water level in the basin falls, a well of cool, moist air tends to form over the surface, restricting evaporation.

A method of constructing the base layer using chalk puddle was described in The Field 14 December 1907. A Sussex farmer born in 1850 tells how he and his forefathers made dew ponds:

The requisite hole having been excavated, the chalk was laid down layer by layer, while a team of oxen harnessed to a heavy broad-wheeled cart was drawn round and round the cup shaped hole to grind the chalk to powder. Water was then thrown over the latter as work progressed, and after nearly a day of this process, the resultant mass of puddled chalk, which had been reduced to the consistency of thick cream, was smoothed out with the back of a shovel from the centre, the surface being left at last as smooth and even as a sheet of glass. A few days later, in the absence of frost or heavy rain, the chalk had become as hard as cement, and would stand for years without letting water through. This old method of making dew ponds seems to have died out when the oxen disappeared from the Sussex hills, but it is evident that the older ponds, many of which have stood for scores of years practically without repair, are still more watertight than most modern ones in which Portland cement has been employed.

The initial supply of water after construction has to be provided by the builders, using artificial means. A preferred method was to arrange to finish the excavation in winter, so that any fallen snow could be collected and heaped into the centre of the pond to await melting.

The discrete occupation of dew pond maker existed, but was rare in the UK by the end of World War II.

== History ==
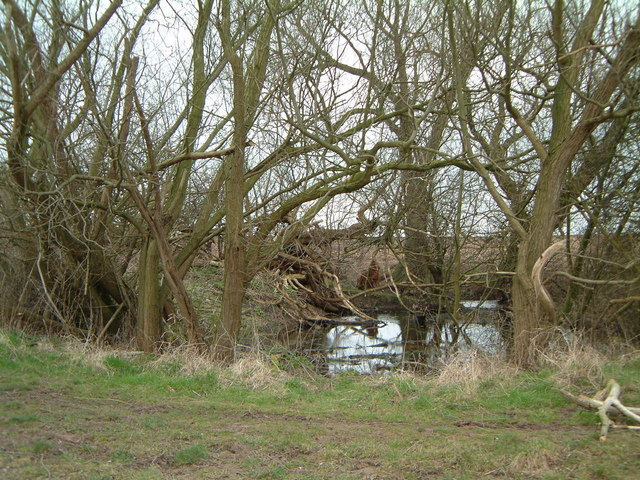
"Some people say an overhanging tree will help a pond". Dew pond on hill above West Leake Nottinghamshire. 52°50′11″N 1°12′57″W

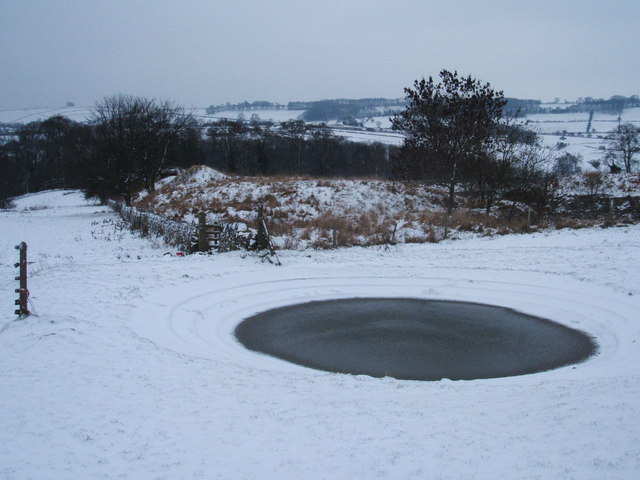
Circular catchment area visible in this Derbyshire (53°13′19″N 1°40′54″W) dew pond pictured in winter

The mystery of dew ponds has drawn the interest of many historians and scientists, but until recent times there has been little agreement on their early origins. It was widely believed that the technique for building dew ponds has been understood from the earliest times, as Kipling tells us in Puck of Pook's Hill: "the Flint Men made the Dewpond under Chanctonbury Ring." The two Chanctonbury Hill dew ponds were dated, from flint tools excavated nearby and similarity to other dated earthworks, to the Neolithic period. Landscape archaeology too seemed to demonstrate that they were used by the inhabitants of the nearby hill fort (probably from an earlier date than that of the surviving late Bronze Age structure) for watering cattle. A more prosaic assessment from Maud Cunnington, an archaeologist from Wiltshire, while not ruling out a prehistoric origin, describes such positive interpretations of the available evidence as no more than “flights of fancy”. A strong claim to antiquity may, however, be made for at least one Wiltshire dew pond: A land deed dated 825 CE mentions Oxenmere (51°22′33″N 1°50′54″W) at Milk Hill, Wiltshire, showing that dew ponds were in use during the Saxon period. The parliamentary enclosures of the mid eighteenth to mid nineteenth centuries caused many new upland ponds to be made, as access to traditional sources of drinking water for livestock was cut off. The suggestion has also been made that the nursery rhyme about Jack and Jill may refer to collecting water from a dew pond at the top of a hill, rather than from a well.

The naturalist Gilbert White, writing in 1788, noted that during extended periods of summer drought the artificial ponds on the downs above his native Selborne, Hampshire, retained their water, despite supplying flocks of sheep, while larger ponds in the valley below had dried up. In 1877 H. P. Slade observed that this was because the lower ponds have debris washed into them from surface water drainage, making them shallow, but the higher ones do not: the smaller volume of water is depleted more rapidly. Later observations demonstrated that during a night of favourable dew formation a typical increase in water level of some two or three inches was possible. However, there remains controversy about the means of replenishment of dew ponds. Experiments conducted in 1885 to determine the origin of the water found that dew forms not from dampness in the air but from moisture in the ground directly beneath the site of the condensation: dew, therefore, was ruled out as a source of replenishment. Other scientists have pointed out that the 1885 experiments failed to take into account the insulating effect of the straw and the cooling effect of the damp clay: the combined effect would be to keep the pond at a lower temperature than the surrounding earth and thus able to condense more moisture.

In 1919 architect George Hubbard, in a lecture at the Royal Institute of British Architects, described how he constructed a 100-foot (30-metre)-square dew pond to demonstrate how to capture at night the large volume of water vapour contained in air warmed during the previous day. The lining of the pond incorporated 2,500 slabs of mica, 2-foot (0.61-metre)-square and of 2-inch (51-millimetre) thickness, set in sand, pitch and asphalt, for insulation from the warm earth. After a rainless autumn night he found that, above the insulated slabs only, a thick layer of hoar frost had formed. As the morning progressed the frost melted to produce "hundreds, if not thousands, of gallons of water", but this rapidly dried out in the heat of the sun.

In turn these conclusions were disproved in the 1930s, when it was pointed out that the heat-retaining quality of water (its thermal capacity) was many times greater than that of earth, and therefore the air above a pond in summer would be the last place to attract condensation. The deciding factor, it was concluded, is the extent of the saucer-shaped basin extending beyond the pond itself: the large basin would collect more rainfall than a pond created without such a surrounding feature.

=== Eponym ===
In 1979 naturalist Ralph Whitlock suggested an alternative origin of the name: after dismissing as "hopelessly wrong" the proposal that "dew" was a corruption of the French language d'eau ("water"), he described how the royal archives at Windsor Castle contained a reference to a certain "Mr Dew" as pond maker to King George III in Hampshire and Surrey. Thus, Dew became an eponym for the artificial downland pond.

== Measuring dew production ==
The first scientific experiments to measure and correlate the rate of dew deposit with evaporation were made by Harry Pool Slade of Aston Upthorpe, Berkshire, between June 1876 and February 1877, at a dew pond on Aston Upthorpe Downs (51°32′58″N 1°13′20″W). Slade measured overnight dew deposit (by weighing cotton wool when dry and after overnight exposure), evaporation from copper pans beside the pond, the depletion of the pond, and relative humidity. He found that on days with heavy overnight dewfall the level of water in the pond was not replenished but invariably diminished.

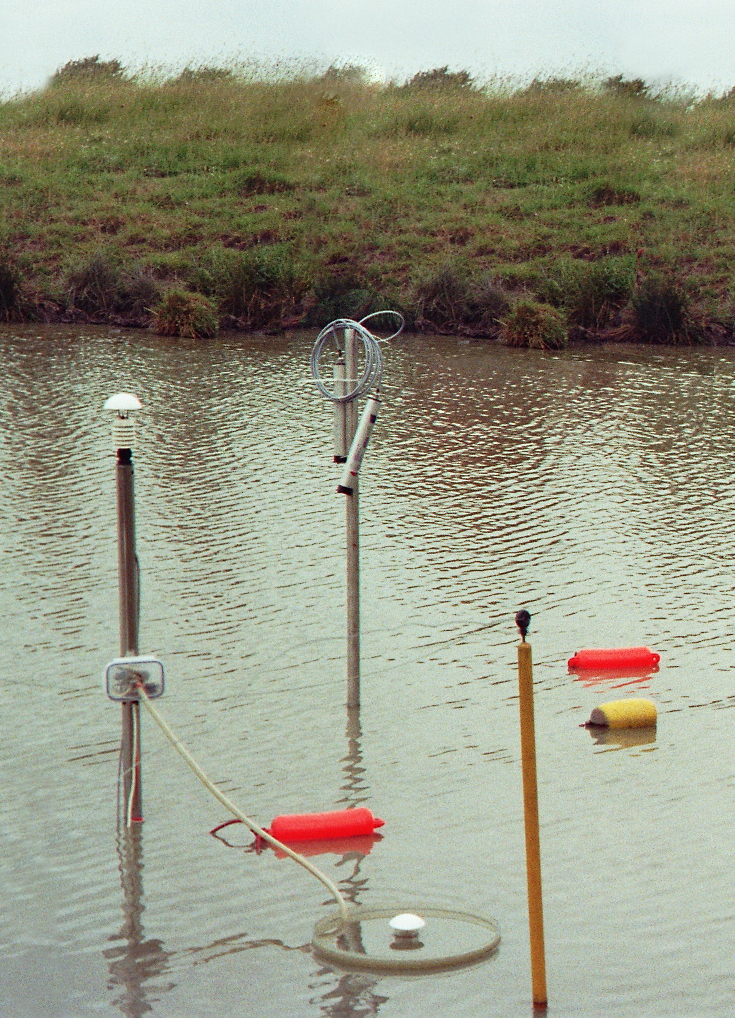
Instruments measuring condensation and evaporation at a Helmfleeth dew pond, 1970

In situ measurements of evaporation and condensation were taken at the Helmfleeth dew pond in Poppenbüll municipality (Eiderstedt Peninsula in Schleswig-Holstein, Germany) using meteorological measuring instruments and a floating evaporation pan after Bernhard Brockamp & Julius Werner (1970). These measurements proved the dew formation on the basis of temperature changes and the weather conditions. The Helmfleeth dew pond is part of the water supply for a marsh area and is still in use today.

== Reproductions of historical dew ponds ==
In 2014, the traditional technique was verified by means of modern building material at reproductions of dew ponds in North Friesland. In this context, various techniques were tried in two terrestrial hollows. Commercially available PVC-film was used for the sealing and foam glass gravel for the insulation. The construction was carried out by craftsmen and the climatological analysis by Julius Werner and Wilhelm Coldewey.

== Distribution ==
Dew ponds are still common on the downlands of southern England, the North Derbyshire and Staffordshire moorlands, and in Nottinghamshire.

== See also ==
- Air well (condenser)
- Rainwater harvesting

== Bibliography ==
- Blundell, E (1909). "Dewponds". Standard Encyclopedia of Modern Agriculture.
- Allcroft, A. Hadrian (1908). Earthwork of England, Chapter 8, Dewponds. Macmillan. pp. 265–286.
- Clutterbuck, J.C. (1865). "Prize Essay on Water Supply". Journal of the Royal Agricultural Society of England. 2nd series, vol. 1: 271–287.
- Hubbard, John; Hubbard, George (1905). Neolithic dew ponds and cattleways. London: Longmans, Green and co. (2nd. ed. 1907, 3rd ed. 1916)
- Martin, Edward Alfred (1914). Dew-ponds: history, observation, and experiment. London: Werner Laurie. OCLC 505154175. "History, observation, and experiment." (2nd. ed. 1915)
- Johnson, Walter (1908). Folk-memory: or, The continuity of British archaeology. Oxford: Oxford. pp. 295–318. "Construction of dew ponds."

=== Journal articles ===
- Beckett & Dufton (May 11, 1935). "Collection of Dew on Roofs". Nature. 135 (3419): 798–9. doi:10.1038/135798b0. S2CID 30099986.
- Walford, E. (October 1924). "The Great Dewpond Myth". Discovery. V: 245.

=== Dewponds in specific locations ===
- Allcroft, A. Hadrian (1924). Downland Pathways. Methuen.
- Wills, Barclay (1989). The Downland Shepherds. Alan Sutton.
- Farey, John (1811). General View of Agriculture and Minerals of Derbyshire.
- Pope, A. (1912). Some Dewponds in Dorset, Dorset County. Chronicle Office.
- Brentnall & Carter (1932). The Marlborough County. Oxford University Press. pp. 57, 58.
- Becket, Arthur (1949). The Spirit of the Downs (8th ed.). Methuen.
- Sussex Geology. Arthur & Co. 1932.
