= Findon, West Sussex =

Village and civil parish in West Sussex, England

Coordinates: 50.8682°N 0.4072°W

Findon
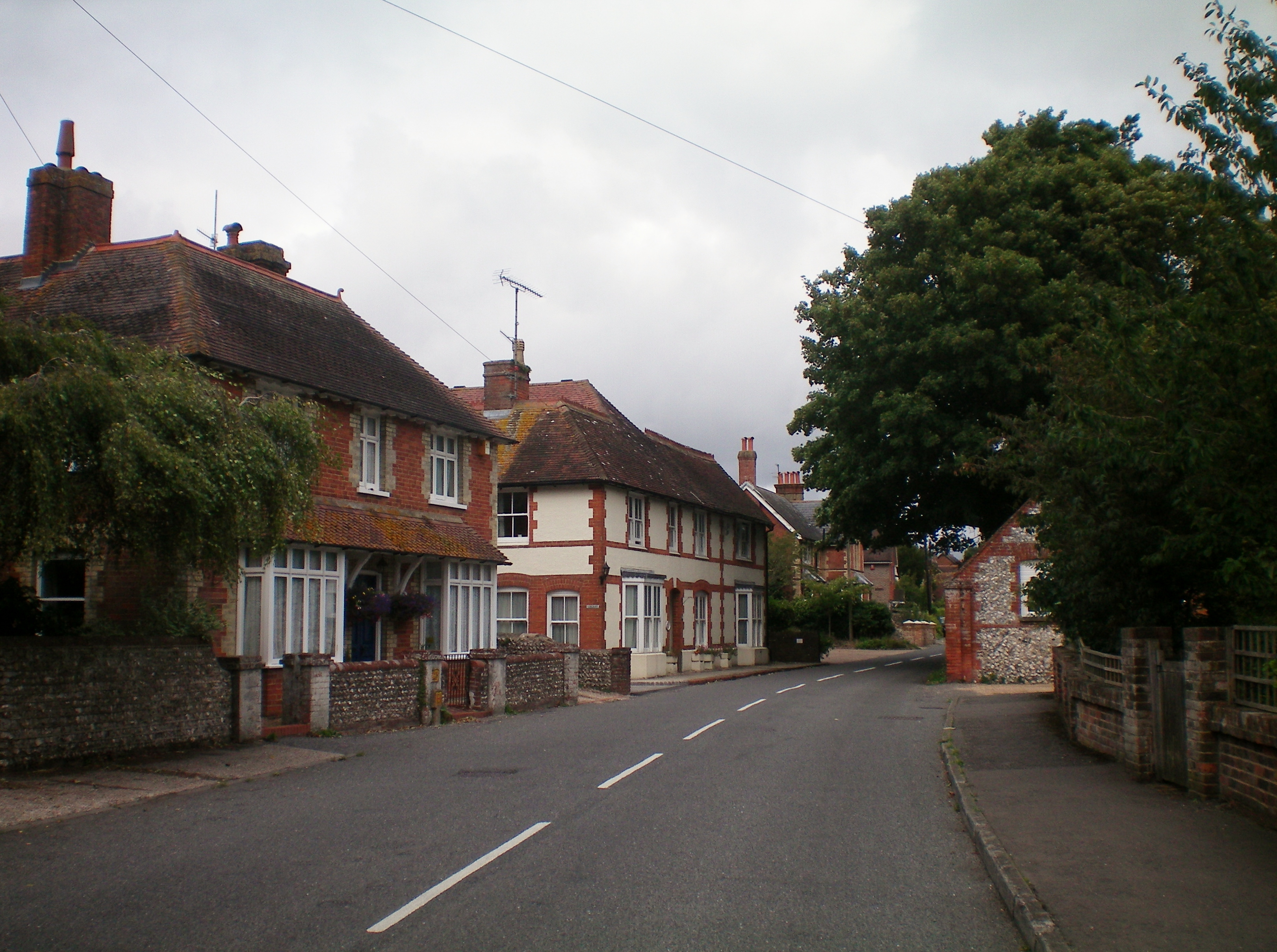
- High Street

- Location within West Sussex
- Area: 16.14 km^{2} (6.23 sq mi)
- Population: 2,023 (Civil Parish.2011)
  - Density: 125/km^{2} (320/sq mi)
- OS grid reference: TQ121088
  - London: 45 miles (72 km) NNE
- Civil parish: Findon
- District: Arun
- Shire county: West Sussex
- Region: South East
- Country: England
- Sovereign state: United Kingdom
- Post town: WORTHING
- Postcode district: BN14
- Dialling code: 01903
- Police: Sussex
- Fire: West Sussex
- Ambulance: South East Coast
- UK Parliament: Arundel and South Downs

Findon is a semi-rural clustered village and civil parish in the Arun District of West Sussex, England, 4 miles (6.4 km) north of Worthing.

== Governance ==
An electoral ward in the same name. This ward stretches south west to Patching with a total ward population as at the 2011 census of 2,557.

== Geography ==
The parish is on the slopes of and between two hills: Cissbury with its Iron Age hill fort to the east and a steep knoll Church Hill to the west. A further escarpment to the West and North stretches along the borders of the area. On the two named hills are remains of prehistoric flint mines where shafts were sunk about 40 feet (12 metres) to reach the best seams of flint which were mined from radiating galleries. Near Muntham Court to the west of the village can be found a late Iron Age and Romano-British settlement site designated as a scheduled monument. The village is now bypassed by the A24 as it crosses the South Downs: the bypass was constructed in 1938. A modern settlement to the south of the village, inside the boundary of the Borough of Worthing is called Findon Valley. The parish is settled as a nucleated village at between 128 ft (39 m) and 276 ft (84 m) above sea level (Ordnance Datum) and the South Downs rise to 560 ft (170 m) and 594 ft (181 m) to west and east respectively.

== Amenities ==
The parish church, dedicated to St John the Baptist, stands to the west of the village and the A24 road near the 18th-century mansion Findon Place. The church is built of flint to an unusual design, the nave and north aisle having been given a single-span roof with king-posts resting on the arcade, probably in the 15th century. The screen is a rare 13th-century example, but heavily restored.

There are four public houses, the Gun Inn, the Black Horse, the Village House, the Snooty Fox (part of the Findon Manor Hotel), all of which are located along the High Street. The High Street also accommodates an Indian takeaway, a post office and corner shop, a butchers, an antique shop, and the high-end restaurant the Sylvan Oak. The village has a small primary school, situated on School Hill, dedicated to Saint John the Baptist. It boasts many annual events, including a fireworks display and May Day celebrations.

== Sport and recreation ==
The Monarch's Way long-distance footpath crosses the village. It is the only significant settlement on the route between Arundel and Bramber.

== Culture ==
Nationally famous stage and screen actress, Nancy Price, lived with her husband for many years in 'Arcana', a house in Heather Lane, till her death in 1970.

The village is the host of the Findon Sheep Fair, an annual event held on the second weekend of every September, with a history dating back to approximately 1785. The event was historically used for the commercial trading of livestock, though this is no longer practised due to both risk of foot and mouth disease and the main road into the village, Long Furlong, becoming unsuitable for livestock herding since the widespread adoption of motor vehicles. At its peak, the fair saw livestock herded in from London, Brighton, Sussex and Surrey of 300 different breeds. Despite changes in its nature, the fair is still a popular event, seeing approximately 7000 visitors each year.
