= List of World Heritage Sites in Eastern Europe =

The United Nations Educational, Scientific and Cultural Organization (UNESCO) designates World Heritage Sites of outstanding universal value to cultural or natural heritage which have been nominated by signatories to the 1972 UNESCO World Heritage Convention. Cultural heritage consists of monuments (such as architectural works, monumental sculptures, or inscriptions), groups of buildings, and sites (including archaeological sites). Natural features (consisting of physical and biological formations), geological and physiographical formations (including habitats of threatened species of animals and plants), and natural sites which are important from the point of view of science, conservation or natural beauty, are defined as natural heritage.

For the purposes of this list Eastern Europe is defined according to the United Nations geoscheme: Russia, Belarus, Poland, Czech Republic, Slovakia, Hungary, Ukraine, Moldova, Romania and Bulgaria. As of 2024, UNESCO has designated 94 World Heritage Sites in these nine countries, termed "state parties" for UNESCO's purposes.

Russia is home to the most inscribed sites with 20 sites in Eastern Europe out of 29 sites in the whole country, two of which are transborder properties. Eight sites are shared between several countries with some of them located partially in Northern or Western Europe: the Curonian Spit (Lithuania and Russia), Caves of Aggtelek Karst and Slovak Karst (Slovakia and Hungary), Primeval Beech Forests of the Carpathians and Other Regions of Europe (Germany, Slovakia, Ukraine, Albania, Austria, Belgium, Bulgaria, Croatia, Italy, Poland, Romania, Slovenia, and Spain), Belovezhskaya Pushcha / Białowieża Forest (Poland and Belarus), Fertö / Neusiedlersee Cultural Landscape (Austria and Hungary), Muskauer Park / Park Mużakowski (Germany and Poland), the Struve Geodetic Arc (ten countries in Northern and Eastern Europe), and Erzgebirge/Krušnohoří Mining Region (Czech Republic and Germany). Moldova has the lowest number of World Heritage Sites in Eastern Europe, with one being the Struve Geodetic Arc transborder site. The first sites from the region were inscribed in 1978, when the Historic Centre of Kraków and the Wieliczka Salt Mine, both in Poland were chosen during the list's conception. Each year, UNESCO's World Heritage Committee may inscribe new sites on the list, or delist sites that no longer meet the criteria. Some sites, designated "mixed sites," represent both cultural and natural heritage. In Eastern Europe, there are 69 cultural, 8 natural, and no mixed sites.

The World Heritage Committee may also specify that a site is endangered, citing "conditions which threaten the very characteristics for which a property was inscribed on the World Heritage List." None of the sites in Eastern Europe is currently listed as endangered. However, two sites, Wieliczka Salt Mine and the Srebarna Nature Reserve, have formerly been listed as endangered but lost this status subsequently. Danger listing has been considered by UNESCO in a number of cases.

== World Heritage Sites ==
UNESCO lists sites under ten criteria; each entry must meet at least one of the criteria. Criteria i through vi are cultural, and vii through x are natural.

* Transnational site
† In danger

World Heritage Sites
Site	Image	Location (Note: The location only specifies the first-level administrative subdivision.: For Russia this would be the subject; For Belarus this would be the Oblast; For Poland this would be the Voivodeship; For the Czech Republic this would be the Region; For Slovakia this would be the Region; For Hungary this would be the County; For Ukraine this would be the Oblast)	Year listed	UNESCO data	Description
Ancient and Primeval Beech Forests of the Carpathians and Other Regions of Europe*		Albania*; Austria*; Belgium*; Bulgaria*; Croatia*; Mecklenburg-Vorpommern, Brandenburg, Thuringia, Hesse, Germany*; Italy*; Poland*; Romania*; Prešov Region, Slovakia*; Slovenia*; Spain*; Zakarpattia Oblast, Ukraine*	2007 (Note: Extended in 2011 to include the Ancient Beech Forests of Germany and name change from Primeval Beech Forests of the Carpathians to the present name. Extended again in 2017 to include additional sites in other countries.)	1133quinquies: ix (natural)	Primeval Beech Forests of the Carpathians are used to study the spread of the beech tree (Fagus sylvatica) in the Northern Hemisphere across a variety of environments and the environment in the forest. The addition of the Ancient Beech Forests of Germany in 2011 included five forests totaling 4,391 hectares (10,850 acres) that are added to the 29,278 hectares (72,350 acres) of Slovak and Ukrainian beech forests inscribed on the World Heritage List in 2007. The site was further expanded in 2017 to include forests in 9 additional European countries.
Ancient City of Nessebar		Nesebar, Burgas Province, Bulgaria	1983	217; iii, iv (cultural)	The coastal city of Nesebar started as a Thracian settlement and became a Greek Black Sea colony in the 6th century BCE. Most remains date to the Hellenistic period, including the acropolis and a temple of Apollo. The city was an important Byzantine Christian centre in the Middle Ages; a basilica and a fortress remain from this period. The 19th century saw the construction of wooden houses in the style of Bulgarian National Revival.
Ancient City of Tauric Chersonese and its Chora		Crimea, Ukraine	2013	1411: ii, iv (cultural)	The city was founded by Dorian Greeks in the 5th century BCE on the coast of the Black Sea. In the following centuries, the city saw the interactions of Greek, Roman, and Byzantine communities in the Black Sea region. It was ultimately abandoned in the 15th century. The area around the city was important due to its wine production, and the remains of ancient vineyards have been well preserved.
Architectural Ensemble of the Trinity Sergius Lavra in Sergiev Posad		Sergiyev Posad, Moscow Oblast, Russia	1993	657: ii, iv (cultural)	This is a fine example of a working Orthodox monastery, with military features that are typical of the 15th to the 18th century, the period during which it developed. The main church of the Lavra, the Cathedral of the Assumption (echoing the Kremlin Cathedral of the same name), contains the tomb of Boris Godunov. Among the treasures of the Lavra is the famous icon, The Trinity, by Andrei Rublev.
Architectural, Residential and Cultural Complex of the Radziwill Family at Nesvizh		Nesvizh, Minsk Region, Belarus	2005	1196: ii, iv, vi (cultural)	Nesvizh Castle was the home of the Radziwiłł family, who built and maintained the castle from the 16th century to 1939. The Radziwiłłs were patrons of sciences and arts and invited artists, craftsmen, and architects to the town of Nesvizh. These interactions helped transmit the trends from Southern and Western Europe to Central and Eastern Europe. The complex comprises the residential castle and the Corpus Christi mausoleum-church, along with their landscaped setting.
Assumption Cathedral and Monastery of the town-island of Sviyazhsk		Sviyazhsk, Rupublic of Tatarstan, Russia	2017	1525: ii, iv (cultural)	The Assumption Cathedral is located in the town-island of Sviyazhsk and is part of the monastery of the same name. Situated at the confluence of the Volga, the Sviyaga and the Shchuka rivers, at the crossroads of the Silk and Volga routes, Sviyazhsk was founded by Ivan the Terrible in 1551. It was from this outpost that he initiated the conquest of the Kazan Khanate. The cathedral's frescoes are among the rarest examples of Eastern Orthodox mural paintings.
Auschwitz Birkenau, German Nazi Concentration and Extermination Camp (1940–1945)		Oświęcim County, Lesser Poland, Poland	1979	31: vi (cultural)	Auschwitz was a network of Nazi concentration and extermination camps built and operated by the Third Reich in Polish areas annexed by Nazi Germany during World War II. It was the largest of the German concentration camps, consisting of Auschwitz I (the Stammlager or base camp); Auschwitz II–Birkenau (the Vernichtungslager or extermination camp); Auschwitz III–Monowitz, also known as Buna–Monowitz (a labor camp); and 45 satellite camps.
Bardejov Town Conservation Reserve		Bardejov, Bardejov District, Prešov Region, Slovakia	2000	973: iii, iv (cultural)	The town of Bardejov is located close to an important trade route to Poland across the Carpathians. The city plan dates to the 13th and 14th century and included fortifications that were advanced for contemporary standards. Burghers' houses from the 15th century and the Gothic Basilica of St Giles surround the main square. Bardejov also includes a small Jewish quarter from the 18th century.
Belovezhskaya Pushcha / Białowieża Forest*		Grodno Region, Belarus* and Podlaskie Voivodeship, Poland*	1979 (Note: Extended in 1992 to include the Belarusian part of the property and name change from Białowieża Forest to the present name.)	33ter: vii (natural)	Białowieża Forest is a large forest complex, including extensive old-growth forests, on the border between Poland and Belarus. It is an example of the Central European mixed forests terrestrial ecoregion, and a range of associated non-forest habitats, including wet meadows, river valleys, and other wetlands. The area is home to the largest free-roaming population of European bison, as well as wolf, lynx, and otter. The Polish part of the site was first added to the list in 1979. The part in Belarus, Belovezhskaya Pushcha, was added in 1992, while the year 2014 saw a large extension of the protected area.
Bolgar Historical and Archaeological Complex		Republic of Tatarstan, Russia	2014	981rev: ii, vi (cultural)	
Boyana Church		Boyana, Sofia, Bulgaria	1979	42: ii, iii (natural)	The Bulgarian Orthodox Boyana Church in the outskirts of Sofia is an ensemble of three buildings. The first part was built in the 10th century, the second in the 13th, and the third in the early 19th century. Wall paintings dating from all periods have been preserved in full or in fragments and have been carefully restored in the 21st century. The frescos from the mid-13th century that were commissioned by Kaloyan Sebastocrator are considered of the best artistic value in the complex.
Budapest, including the Banks of the Danube, the Buda Castle Quarter and Andrássy Avenue		Budapest, Hungary	1987 (Note: Extended in 2002 to include Andrássy Avenue and the Millennium Underground and name change from Budapest, the Banks of the Danube and the Buda Castle Quarter to the present name.)	400bis: ii, iv (cultural)	Budapest was created by the unification of three cities, Buda, Pest, and Óbuda, in the 19th century. The Buda Castle was built in the 13th century by king Béla IV of Hungary. The Castle Quarter features buildings in the Gothic and Baroque styles. Buildings in Pest are in the Historicism and Art Nouveau styles. The Andrássy Avenue, which was added as an extension to the World Heritage Site in 2002, was built in the late 19th century and marked the transformation of Budapest into a modern metropolis. The Millennium Underground Railway that runs under the avenue was the first underground in Continental Europe and has been operational since 1896.
Castle of the Teutonic Order in Malbork		Malbork, Pomeranian Voivodeship, Poland	1997	847: ii, iii, iv (cultural)	The Castle in Malbork was built in Prussia by the Teutonic Knights, a German Roman Catholic religious order of crusaders, in a form of an Ordensburg fortress. The Order named it Marienburg (Mary's Castle). The town which grew around it was also named Marienburg. The castle is a classic example of a medieval fortress, and on its completion in 1406 was the world's largest brick Gothic castle.
Caves of Aggtelek Karst and Slovak Karst*		Rožňava and Spišská Nová Ves Districts, Košice Region Slovakia* and Northern Hungary, Hungary*	1995 (Note: Extended in 2000 to include Dobšiná Ice Cave and modification of boundaries in 2008: increase of property at Esztramos Hill from 107.2 (265) to 195 (480) and establishment of a 28,000 (69,000) buffer zone on the Hungarian side.)	725ter: vii (natural)	The site comprises 712 caves in Hungary and Slovakia. They represent a typical temperate-zone karstic system. The sediments and fossils in the caves show geological records of Late Cretaceous and early Tertiary subtropical and tropical climatic conditions, as well as the Pleistocene glaciations. In 2000, the Dobšiná Ice Cave on the Slovak side was added as an extension to the site. A modification of the site boundaries on the Hungarian side took place in 2008.
Centennial Hall in Wrocław		Wrocław, Lower Silesian Voivodeship, Poland	2006	1165: i, ii, iv (cultural)	The Centennial Hall is an early Modernist building made of reinforced concrete. It was designed by Max Berg as a multifunctional venue to serve as an exhibition ground or an assembly hall and to host sport events, concerts, and theatre performances. Built in 1911–1913, it had the largest reinforced concrete dome in the world at the time of its construction. It served as a reference point for later buildings constructed of this material.
Church of the Ascension, Kolomenskoye		Kolomenskoye, Moscow, Russia	1994	634rev: ii (cultural)	The Church of the Ascension was built in 1532 on the imperial estate of Kolomenskoye, near Moscow, to celebrate the birth of the prince who was to become Tsar Ivan IV ('the Terrible'). One of the earliest examples of a traditional wooden tent-roofed church on a stone and brick substructure, it had a great influence on the development of Russian ecclesiastical architecture.
Citadel, Ancient City and Fortress Buildings of Derbent		Derbent, Dagestan, Russia	2003	1070: iii, iv (cultural)	The Citadel, Ancient City and Fortress Buildings of Derbent were part of the northern lines of the Sasanian Persian Empire, which extended east and west of the Caspian Sea. The fortification was built in stone. It consisted of two parallel walls that formed a barrier from the seashore up to the mountain. The town of Derbent was built between these two walls, and has retained part of its medieval fabric. The site continued to be of great strategic importance until the 19th century.
Churches of Moldavia		Suceava County (Moldavia), Romania	1993 (Note: Extended in 2010 to include Sucevița Monastery.)	598bis: i, iv (cultural)	This site comprises eight churches built in the 15th and 16th centuries. In line with the regional period style, the facades of the churches are entirely covered by frescos inspired by Byzantine art. The paintings depict Biblical themes and are well preserved. The churches include the Beheading of Saint John the Baptist Church, the Assumption of the Virgin and of Saint George's Church of the Humor Monastery, the Church of the Annunciation of Moldovița Monastery, the Sacred Cross Church, the Saint Nicolas' Church of Probota Monastery, the Saint John the New Monastery, the Saint George's Church of the former Voroneț Monastery, and the Church of the Resurrection of Sucevița Monastery (pictured). The latter church was added to the list in 2010.
Churches of Peace in Jawor and Świdnica		Jawor and Świdnica, Lower Silesian Voivodeship, Poland	2001	1054: iii, iv, vi (cultural)	The Churches of Peace in Jawor and Świdnica in Silesia were named after the Peace of Westphalia of 1648 which permitted the Lutherans in the Roman Catholic parts of Silesia to build three Evangelical churches from wood, loam and straw outside the city walls, without steeples and church bells. The construction time was limited to one year.
Churches of the Pskov School of Architecture		Pskov, Russia	2019	1523: ii (cultural)	This site comprises ten churches or monasteries and related buildings in the city of Pskov. They represent the work of the Pskov School that drew from the Byzantine and Novgorod traditions, fused them with the local vernacular tradition, and adjusted the architecture to the use of local resources. The churches date from the 12th to the early 17th century, with the peak of this style in the 15th and 16th centuries. The architects from Pskov worked on monuments in several Russian cities, including Moscow, Kazan, and Sviyazhsk. The Cathedral of St. John from the 12th century is pictured.
Historic Centre of Kraków		Kraków, Lesser Poland, Poland	1978 (Note: Addition of the buffer zone in 2010.)	29bis: iv (cultural)	Kraków Old Town is the historic central district of Kraków, Poland. It is one of the most famous old districts in Poland today and was the center of Poland's political life from 1038 until King Sigismund III Vasa relocated his court to Warsaw in 1596. The entire medieval old town is among the first sites chosen for the UNESCO's World Heritage List, inscribed as Kraków's Historic Centre.
Cultural and Historic Ensemble of the Solovetsky Islands		Arkhangelsk Oblast, Russia	1992	632: iv (cultural)	The Solovetsky archipelago comprises six islands in the western part of the White Sea, covering 300 km2. They have been inhabited since the 5th century B.C. and important traces of a human presence from as far back as the 5th millennium B.C. can be found there. The archipelago has been the site of fervent monastic activity since the 15th century, and there are several churches dating from the 16th to the 19th century.
Curonian Spit*		Neringa and Klaipėda district, Klaipėda County, Lithuania* and Zelenogradsky District, Kaliningrad Oblast, Russia*	2000	994: v (cultural)	Human habitation of this elongated sand dune peninsula, 98 km long and 0.4–4 km wide, dates back to prehistoric times. Throughout this period it has been threatened by the natural forces of wind and waves. Its survival to the present day has been made possible only as a result of ceaseless human efforts to combat the erosion of the Spit, dramatically illustrated by continuing stabilisation and reforestation projects.
Dacian Fortresses of the Orastie Mountains		Hunedoara and Alba Counties (Transylvania), Romania	1999	906: ii, iii, iv (cultural)	Sarmizegetusa Regia was the capital and the most important military, religious and political centre of the Dacians. Erected on top of a 1,200-metre-high (3,900 ft) mountain, the fortress was the core of the strategic defensive system in the Orăştie Mountains (in present-day Romania), comprising six citadels. Sarmizegetusa Regia was the capital of Dacia prior to the wars with the Roman Empire.
Danube Delta		Tulcea County (Dobruja), Romania	1991	588: vii, x (natural)	The Danube Delta, where the Danube river enters the Black Sea, is the largest European wetland. It is home to over 300 bird and 45 freshwater fish species, including the endangered sturgeons. Mammal species include European mink, European wildcat, Eurasian otter, and the threatened monk seal.
Early Christian Necropolis of Pécs (Sopianae)		Pécs, Baranya County, Hungary	2000	853rev: iii, iv (cultural)	The early Christian necropolis of the Roman provincial town of Sopianae, on the site of modern Pécs, was constructed in the 4th century. The tombs were built underground and were richly decorated with Christian-themed murals. Several tombs had memorial chapels erected above the ground.
Erzgebirge/Krušnohoří Mining Region*	Front and back of a silver coin.	Saxony, Germany*, Czech Republic*	2019	1478: ii, iii, iv (cultural)	The mountains in south-west Germany and north-west Czechia have been a source of metals including silver, tin and uranium beginning in the 12th century. The cultural landscape of the region was shaped by mining and smelting innovations.
Ensemble of the Ferapontov Monastery		Vologda Oblast, Russia	2000	982: i, iv (cultural)	The Ferapontov Monastery, in the Vologda region in northern Russia, is an exceptionally well-preserved and complete example of a Russian Orthodox monastic complex of the 15th-17th centuries, a period of great significance in the development of the unified Russian state and its culture. The architecture of the monastery is outstanding in its inventiveness and purity. The interior is graced by the magnificent wall paintings of Dionisy, the greatest Russian artist of the end of the 15th century.
Ensemble of the Novodevichy Convent		Moscow, Russia	2004	1097: i, iv, vi (cultural)	The Novodevichy Convent, in south-western Moscow, built in the 16th and 17th centuries in the so-called Moscow Baroque style, was part of a chain of monastic ensembles that were integrated into the defence system of the city. The convent was directly associated with the political, cultural and religious history of Russia, and closely linked to the Moscow Kremlin. It was used by women of the Tsar's family and the aristocracy. Members of the Tsar's family and entourage were also buried in its cemetery. The convent provides an example of the highest accomplishments of Russian architecture with rich interiors and an important collection of paintings and artefacts.
Fertö / Neusiedlersee Cultural Landscape*		Burgenland Austria* and Győr-Moson-Sopron County, Hungary*	2001	772rev: v (cultural)	The Fertö/Neusiedler Lake area has been occupied by different peoples for eight millennia. The original network of towns and villages dates to the 12th and 13th centuries. Several palaces were constructed in the 18th and 19th centuries. The site is shared with Austria.
Frontiers of the Roman Empire – The Danube Limes (Western Segment)*	Roman ruins	Austria*, Germany*, Slovakia*	2021	1608bis: ii, iii, iv (cultural)	The Danubian Limes, a network of fortifications along the Danube river, protected the borders of the Roman Empire. The site is shared with Germany and Austria. Six sites at two locations, of military camps Celemantia and Gerulata (ruins pictured), are listed in Slovakia.
Gardens and Castle at Kroměříž		Kroměříž, Zlín Region, Czech Republic	1998	860: ii, iv (cultural)	The Castle in Kroměříž was constructed in the 17th and 18th centuries in the early Baroque style and served as the residence of the archbishop of Olomouc. The Pleasure Garden (pictured), laid out in 1665–1675, is a rare example of a Baroque garden that has remained relatively intact. It influenced the development of other gardens in central Europe. The Castle Garden features buildings in Neoclassical and French Empire styles.
Historic and Architectural Complex of the Kazan Kremlin		Kazan, Tatarstan, Russia	2000	980: ii, iii, iv (cultural)	Built on an ancient site, the Kazan Kremlin dates from the Muslim period of the Golden Horde and the Kazan Khanate. It was conquered by Ivan the Terrible in 1552 and became the Christian See of the Volga Land. The only surviving Tatar fortress in Russia and an important place of pilgrimage, the Kazan Kremlin consists of an outstanding group of historic buildings dating from the 16th to 19th centuries, integrating remains of earlier structures of the 10th to 16th centuries.
Historic Centre of Saint Petersburg and Related Groups of Monuments		Saint Petersburg, Russia	1990	540bis: i, ii, iv, vi (cultural)	The 'Venice of the North', with its numerous canals and more than 400 bridges, is the result of a vast urban project begun in 1703 under Peter the Great. Later known as Leningrad (in the former USSR), the city is closely associated with the October Revolution. Its architectural heritage reconciles the very different Baroque and pure neoclassical styles, as can be seen in the Admiralty, the Winter Palace, the Marble Palace and the Hermitage.
Historical Centre of the City of Yaroslavl		Yaroslavl, Yaroslavl Oblast, Russia	2005	1170: ii, iv (cultural)	Situated at the confluence of the Volga and Kotorosl Rivers some 250 km north-east of Moscow, the historic city of Yaroslavl developed into a major commercial centre from the 11th century. It is renowned for its numerous 17th-century churches and is an outstanding example of the urban planning reform Empress Catherine the Great ordered for the whole of Russia in 1763. While keeping some of its significant historic structures, the town was renovated in the neoclassical style on a radial urban master plan. It has also kept elements from the 16th century in the Spassky Monastery, one of the oldest in the Upper Volga region, built on the site of a pagan temple in the late 12th century but reconstructed over time.
Historic Centre of Český Krumlov		Český Krumlov, South Bohemian Region, Czech Republic	1992	617: iv (cultural)	The town of Český Krumlov was built around the eponymous 13th century castle on a meander of the Vltava river. The castle was built in Gothic style, with later additions of Late Gothic, Renaissance and Baroque elements. The town preserves the street layout from the Middle Ages, while the house facades feature decorations in the Renaissance and Baroque styles. The town was not affected by the industrialisation in the 19th century.
Historic Centre of Odesa†	Opera building in Odesa	Odesa Oblast, Ukraine	2023	1703: ii, iv (cultural)	The city of Odesa rapidly developed as a port city in the late 18th and 19th centuries. A multicultural city, it was home to Bulgarians, Greeks, Armenians, Jews, Italians, Moldovans, Poles, Russians, Romanians, Tatars, and Ukrainians, whose traditions blended into a single socio-cultural environment within a century. Odesa preserves a number of 19th-century buildings and architectural ensembles, including Prymorskyi Boulevard, the Potemkin Stairs, and the Odesa Opera and Ballet Theater (pictured). The site was immediately listed as endangered because of the 2022 Russian invasion.
Historic Centre of Prague		Prague, Czech Republic	1992	616bis: ii, iv, vi (cultural)	Prague, situated on the banks of the Vltava river, has been an important European city since the Middle Ages. During the reign of Charles IV, Holy Roman Emperor (1346–1378), several monuments were constructed in the Gothic style, including Prague Castle, St. Vitus Cathedral, and Charles Bridge. The University of Prague, one of the oldest universities in Europe, was founded in 1348, and made Prague one of the leading centres of learning. Průhonice Park, which lies outside of Prague, has been included in 2010 as a masterpiece of garden landscape architecture of worldwide importance. A minor boundary modification of the World Heritage Site took place in 2012.
Historic Centre of Sighişoara		Sighișoara, Mureș County (Transylvania), Romania	1999	902: iii, v (cultural)	
Historic Centre of Telč		Telč, Vysočina Region, Czech Republic	1992	621: i, iv (cultural)	
Historic Centre of Warsaw		Warsaw, Masovian Voivodeship, Poland	1980	30bis: ii, vi (cultural)	Warsaw's Old Town was established in the 13th century. Initially surrounded by an earthwork rampart, prior to 1339 it was fortified with brick city walls. The town originally grew up around the castle of the Dukes of Mazovia that later became the Royal Castle. The Market Square (Rynek Starego Miasta) was laid out sometime in the late 13th or early 14th century, along the main road linking the castle with the New Town to the north.
Historic Monuments of Novgorod and Surroundings		Novgorod, Novgorod Oblast, Russia	1992	604: ii, iv, vi (cultural)	Situated on the ancient trade route between Central Asia and northern Europe, Novgorod was Russia's first capital in the 9th century. Surrounded by churches and monasteries, it was a centre for Orthodox spirituality as well as Russian architecture. Its medieval monuments and the 14th-century frescoes of Theophanes the Greek (Andrei Rublev's teacher) illustrate the development of its remarkable architecture and cultural creativity.
Historic Town of Banská Štiavnica and the Technical Monuments in its Vicinity		Banská Štiavnica and Banská Štiavnica District, Banská Bystrica Region, Slovakia	1993	618rev: iv, v (cultural)	
Holašovice Historical Village Reservation		Holašovice, Jankov, South Bohemian Region, Czech Republic	1998	861: ii, iv (cultural)	
Holy Trinity Column in Olomouc		Olomouc, Olomouc Region, Czech Republic	2000	859rev: i, iv (cultural)	
Hortobágy National Park – the Puszta		Borsod-Abaúj-Zemplén, Heves, Hajdú-Bihar and Jász-Nagykun-Szolnok Counties, Hungary	1999	474rev: iv, v (cultural)	
Jewish Quarter and St Procopius' Basilica in Třebíč		Třebíč, Vysočina Region, Czech Republic	2003	1078bis: ii, iii (cultural)	
Kalwaria Zebrzydowska: the Mannerist Architectural and Park Landscape Complex and Pilgrimage Park		Kalwaria Zebrzydowska, Lesser Poland, Poland	1999	905: ii, iv (cultural)	The town is named after the religious complex (calvary) founded by Governor of Kraków Mikołaj Zebrzydowski on December 1, 1602. The complex is known as the Kalwaria Zebrzydowska park. The city of Zebrzydów was established in 1617 in order to house the growing number of pilgrims visiting the religious complex.
Krzemionki Prehistoric Striped Flint Mining Region		Ostrowiec Świętokrzyski, Poland	2019	1599: iii, iv (cultural)	A Neolithic and early Bronze Age complex of flint mines for the extraction of Upper Jurassic (Oxfordian) banded flints located about eight kilometers north-east of Ostrowiec Świętokrzyski. It is one of the largest known complex of prehistoric flint mines in Europe together with Grimes Graves in England and Spiennes in Belgium.
Kyiv: Saint-Sophia Cathedral and Related Monastic Buildings, Kyiv-Pechersk Lavra		Kyiv, Ukraine	1990 (Note: Increase in the size of the buffer zone of Saint-Sophia Cathedral by 6.63 (16.4) in 2005.)	527ter: i, ii, iii, iv (cultural)	Saint Sophia Cathedral was a cathedral temple of Kyiv in 1037–1299. It is an outstanding architectural monument of Kyivan Rus'. The cathedral includes an ensemble of supporting structures such as a bell tower, the House of Metropolitan, and others. Kyiv Pechersk Lavra since its foundation as the cave monastery in 1051 has been a preeminent center of the Eastern Orthodox Christianity in Eastern Europe.
Kizhi Pogost		Medvezhyegorsky District, Republic of Karelia, Russia	1990	544: i, iv, v (cultural)	The pogost of Kizhi (i.e. the Kizhi enclosure) is located on one of the many islands in Lake Onega, in Karelia. Two 18th-century wooden churches, and an octagonal clock tower, also in wood and built in 1862, can be seen there. These unusual constructions, in which carpenters created a bold visionary architecture, perpetuate an ancient model of parish space and are in harmony with the surrounding landscape.
Kremlin and Red Square, Moscow		Moscow, Russia	1990	545: i, ii, iv, vi (cultural)	Inextricably linked to all the most important historical and political events in Russia since the 13th century, the Kremlin (built between the 14th and 17th centuries by outstanding Russian and foreign architects) was the residence of the Great Prince and also a religious centre. At the foot of its ramparts, on Red Square, St Basil's Basilica is one of the most beautiful Russian Orthodox monuments.
Kutná Hora: Historical Town Centre with the Church of St Barbara and the Cathedral of Our Lady at Sedlec		Kutná Hora and Kutná Hora District, Central Bohemian Region, Czech Republic	1995	732: ii, iv (cultural)	
Landscape for Breeding and Training of Ceremonial Carriage Horses at Kladruby nad Labem		Kladruby nad Labem, Pardubice Region, Czech Republic	2019	1589bis: iv, v (cultural)	
Lednice-Valtice Cultural Landscape		Břeclav District, South Moravian Region, Czech Republic	1996	763: i, ii, iv (cultural)	
Levoča, Spišský Hrad and the Associated Cultural Monuments		Prešov and Košice Regions, Slovakia	1993 (Note: Extended in 2009 to include Levoča and the Work of Master Paul in Spiš and name change from Spišský Hrad and its associated cultural monuments to the present name.)	620bis: iv (cultural)	
Litomyšl Castle		Litomyšl, Pardubice Region, Czech Republic	1999	901: ii, iv (cultural)	
L'viv – the Ensemble of the Historic Centre		Lviv, Lviv Oblast, Ukraine	1998 (Note: Minor adjustment of the buffer to follow the boundary of the L'viv Historic Area in 2008.)	865bis: ii, v (cultural)	
Madara Rider		Madara, Shumen Province, Bulgaria	1979	42: i, iii (cultural)	
Medieval Town of Toruń		Toruń, Kuyavian-Pomeranian Voivodeship, Poland	1997	835: ii, iv (cultural)	Toruń has many monuments of architecture beginning from the Middle Ages, including 200 military structures. The city is famous for having preserved almost intact its medieval spatial layout and many Gothic buildings, all built from brick, including monumental churches, the Town Hall and many burgher houses. In 1236, due to frequent flooding, the city was relocated to the present site of the Old Town. In 1264 the nearby New Town was founded. In 1280, the city (or as it was then, both cities) joined the mercantile Hanseatic League, and thus became an important medieval trade centre.
Millenary Benedictine Abbey of Pannonhalma and its Natural Environment		Pannonhalma, Győr-Moson-Sopron County, Hungary	1996	758: iv, vi (cultural)	
Mir Castle Complex		Karelichy, Grodno Region, Belarus	2000	625: ii, iv (cultural)	
Monastery of Horezu		Horezu, Vâlcea County (Wallachia), Romania	1993	597: ii (cultural)	
Muskauer Park / Park Mużakowski		Saxony, Germany* and Lubusz Voivodeship, Poland*	2004	1127bis: i, iv (cultural)	
Old City of Zamość		Zamość, Lublin Voivodeship, Poland	1992	564: iv (cultural)	Jan Zamoyski commissioned the Italian architect Bernardo Morando to design the city that would be based on the anthropomorphic concept. The main distinguishing features of the Old Town have been well preserved since its establishment. It includes the regular Great Market Square of 100 x 100 meters with the splendid Townhall and so-called Armenian houses, as well as the fragments of the original fortress and fortifications, including those from the period of the Russian occupation in the 19th century
Old Village of Hollókő and its Surroundings		Nógrád County, Hungary	1987	401rev: v (cultural)	
Petroglyphs of Lake Onega and the White Sea	A set of petroglyphs found in the Besov Nos cape of the Lake Onega region.	Karelia, Russia	2021	1654: iii (cultural)	This site comprises 33 properties with petroglyphs in two clusters. The petroglyphs at Lake Onega depict birds, animals, half human and half animal figures, as well as geometric shapes possibly representing the moon and the sun. The petroglyphs at the White Sea represent hunting and sailing scenes, together with related equipment, as well as animal and human footprints. They were created 6 and 7 thousand years ago and provide an insight into the lives of Neolithic cultures of Fennoscandia.
Pilgrimage Church of St John of Nepomuk at Zelená Hora		Žďár nad Sázavou, Vysočina Region, Czech Republic	1994	690: iv (cultural)	
Pirin National Park		Pirin Mountains, Blagoevgrad Province, Bulgaria	1983 (Note: Extended in 2010 in order to strengthen the integrity and management of the property.)	225bis: vii, viii, ix	The national park in the Pirin Mountains comprises different types of mountain habitats, from pine forests, alpine meadows, and high mountains, with the highest peak at 2,914 m (9,560 ft). It is home to many plant and animal species, including brown bear and wolf. The site boundaries were extended in 2010.
Residence of Bukovinian and Dalmatian Metropolitans		Chernivtsi, Chernivtsi Oblast (Bukovina), Ukraine	2011	1330: ii, iii, iv (cultural)	The Residence of Bukovinian and Dalmatian Metropolitans was built for the Eastern Orthodox metropolitan bishop in the late 19th century, when the region was under the rule of Austria-Hungary. It was designed by the Czech architect Josef Hlávka. The ensemble is built in the historicist style and combines features of Byzantine, Gothic, and Baroque architecture. The complex served as the bishop's residence until World War II. In 1955, the property was transferred to Chernivtsi University.
Rila Monastery		Rila, Kyustendil Province, Bulgaria	1983	216: vi (cultural)	The monastery was founded in the 10th century by Saint John of Rila and was an important spiritual and cultural centre of Bulgaria through centuries. It was especially important as a Christian centre during the Ottoman rule in Bulgaria. The monastery was destroyed in a fire in the early 19th century and rebuilt between 1834 and 1862, at the time of Bulgarian National Revival.
Rock-Hewn Churches of Ivanovo		Ivanovo, Ruse Province, Bulgaria	1979	45: i, iii (cultural)	In the 12th century, hermits started carving churches, cells, and monasteries in the cliffs above the river Rusenski Lom, near the village of Ivanovo. The frescos from the 14th century, during the Second Bulgarian Empire, are some of the finest examples of the Palaeologues style and represent a departure from the earlier Byzantine iconography, by means of composition and motives.
Roșia Montană Mining Landscape^{†}		Roșia Montană, Alba County, Romania	2021	1552rev: ii, iii, iv (cultural)	
The Great Spa Towns of Europe	Maxim Gorky colonnade in Mariánské Lázně	Austria*, Belgium*, Czech Republic*, France*, Germany*, Italy*, United Kingdom*	2021	1613bis: ii, iii, iv, vi (cultural)	The Great Spa Towns of Europe comprises 11 spa towns in seven European countries where mineral waters were used for healing and therapeutic purposes before the development of industrial medication in the 19th century. The towns of Karlovy Vary, Mariánské Lázně (pictured), and Františkovy Lázně are listed in the Czech Republic.
Srebarna Nature Reserve†	150x	Srebarna, Silistra Province, Bulgaria	1983 (Note: Creation of the buffer zone in 2008.)	219bis: x (natural)	The site had been listed as endangered 1999–2003 due to the prevention of seasonal flooding and agricultural use causing a decline or disappearance of the water and passerine bird populations.
Struve Geodetic Arc		Belarus*, Estonia*, Finland*, Latvia*, Lithuania*, Moldova*, Norway*, Russia*, Sweden* and Ukraine*	2005	1187: i, iii, vi (cultural)	The Struve Arc is a chain of survey triangulations stretching from Hammerfest in Norway to the Black Sea, through 10 countries and over 2,820 km. These are points of a survey, carried out between 1816 and 1855 by the astronomer Friedrich Georg Wilhelm Struve, which represented the first accurate measuring of a long segment of a meridian. This helped to establish the exact size and shape of the planet and marked an important step in the development of earth sciences and topographic mapping. It is an extraordinary example of scientific collaboration among scientists from different countries, and of collaboration between monarchs for a scientific cause. The original arc consisted of 258 main triangles with 265 main station points. The listed site includes 34 of the original station points, with different markings, i.e. a drilled hole in rock, iron cross, cairns, or built obelisks.
Tarnowskie Góry Lead-Silver-Zinc Mine and its Underground Water Management System		Tarnowskie Góry, Silesian Voivodeship, Poland	2017	1539: i, ii, iv (cultural)	
Thracian Tomb of Kazanlak		Kazanlak, Stara Zagora Province, Bulgaria	1979	44: i, iii, iv (cultural)	The tomb dates to the Hellenistic period, at the end of the 4th century BCE. It is a beehive tomb (a tholos), with a narrow corridor and a round burial chamber. The frescos in the tomb depict Thracian culture and burial rites. The tomb is a part of a larger necropolis, located near the ancient Thracian city of Seuthopolis, the capital of king Seuthes III. It was rediscovered in 1944, with frescos remarkably well-preserved.
Thracian Tomb of Sveshtari		Sveshtari, Razgrad Province, Bulgaria	1985	359: i, iii (cultural)	The Thracian tomb dates to the 3rd century BCE and was rediscovered in 1982. The decoration is extremely well preserved and is a rare example of Thracian architecture. It represents the local art of the Gets, inspired by Hellenism. A prominent feature of the tomb are 10 caryatids which are half women and half plants.
Tokaj Wine Region Historic Cultural Landscape		Borsod-Abaúj-Zemplén County, Hungary	2002	1063: iii, v (cultural)	Tokaj Wine Region is located in the hills of north eastern Hungary. It was formally established in 1737 by Charles VI, Holy Roman Emperor, though the documented wine production dates to 1561. It is a cultural landscape linked to the production of the Tokaji wines, with vineyards, farms, villages, small towns, and wine cellars.
Tugendhat Villa in Brno		Brno, South Moravian Region, Czech Republic	2001	1052: ii, iv (cultural)	The Tugendhat Villa was designed by the German architect Ludwig Mies van der Rohe in the 1920s for Grete and Frits Tugendhat, members of a rich industrial family from Brno. The villa is an example of the International Style of architecture. Mies van der Rohe also designed the furniture and the adjacent garden.
Villages with Fortified Churches in Transylvania		Alba, Brașov, Harghita, Mureș and Sibiu counties (Transylvania), Romania	1993 (Note: The original site comprised only the village and church of Biertan. Extended in 1999 to include a total of seven churches and name change from Biertan and its fortified Church to the present name.)	596bis: iv (cultural)	This site comprises seven villages with fortified churches that were built between the 13th and the 16th centuries by Transylvanian Saxons. The settlement pattern and the organization of the villages has been preserved since the Middle Ages. Six villages (Câlnic, Dârjiu, Prejmer, Saschiz, Valea Viilor, and Viscri) were listed in the original nomination in 1993 while the village of Biertan (the fortified church is pictured) was added in 1999.
Virgin Komi Forests		Komi Republic, Russia	1995	719: vii, ix (natural)	The Virgin Komi Forests cover 3.28 million ha of tundra and mountain tundra in the Urals, as well as one of the most extensive areas of virgin boreal forest remaining in Europe. This vast area of conifers, aspens, birches, peat bogs, rivers and natural lakes has been monitored and studied for over 50 years. It provides valuable evidence of the natural processes affecting biodiversity in the taiga.
Vlkolínec		Ružomberok District, Žilina Region, Slovakia	1993	622rev: iv, v (cultural)	Vlkolínec represents a traditional European rural settlement in a mountainous area, and is the best preserved ensemble of that type in the region. The village comprises 43 traditional log houses which mostly date to the 19th century, a church with a bell tower, and a school.
Western Caucasus		Krasnodar Krai, Russia	1999	900: ix, x (natural)	The Western Caucasus, extending over 275,000 ha of the extreme western end of the Caucasus mountains and located 50 km north-east of the Black Sea, is one of the few large mountain areas of Europe that has not experienced significant human impact. Its subalpine and alpine pastures have only been grazed by wild animals, and its extensive tracts of undisturbed mountain forests, extending from the lowlands to the subalpine zone, are unique in Europe. The site has a great diversity of ecosystems, with important endemic plants and wildlife, and is the place of origin and reintroduction of the mountain subspecies of the European bison.
White Monuments of Vladimir and Suzdal		Vladimir and Suzdal, Vladimir Oblast, Russia	1992	633: i, ii, iv (cultural)	These two artistic centres in central Russia hold an important place in the country's architectural history. There are a number of magnificent 12th- and 13th-century public and religious buildings, above all the masterpieces of the Collegiate Church of St Demetrios and the Cathedral of the Assumption of the Virgin.
Wieliczka and Bochnia Royal Salt Mines		Wieliczka, Lesser Poland, Poland	1978 (Note: Minor modification of the buffer zone in 2008 to cover the area of the projection of the mine; extended in 2013 to include Bochnia Salt Mine workings.)	32ter: iv (cultural)	The Wieliczka Salt Mine, located in the town of Wieliczka in southern Poland, lies within the Kraków metropolitan area. The mine continuously produced table salt from the 13th century until 2007 as one of the world's oldest operating salt mines, for most of this time span being a part of the undertaking żupy krakowskie. It is believed to be the world's 14th-oldest company. The site had been listed as endangered 1989–1998 due to a humidity problem.
Wooden Churches of Maramureş		Maramureș (Transylvania), Romania	1999	904: iv (cultural)	This site comprises eight churches from the 17th and 18th century in Maramureș County. The churches are made of wood and they combine influences of Orthodox and Gothic architecture styles. Some of the common characteristics of the churches include tall, slim clock towers and roofs covered by shingles. The list includes the Church of the Presentation of the Virgin in the Temple in Bârsana, the Church of Saint Nicholas (pictured) in Budești, the Saint Parascheva Church in Desești, the Church of the Nativity of the Virgin in Ieud Deal, the Church of the Holy Archangels in Plopiș, the Saint Parascheva Church in Poienile Izei, the Church of the Holy Archangels in Rogoz, and the Church of the Holy Archangels in Șurdești.
Wooden Churches of Southern Małopolska		Lesser Poland Voivodeship and Podkarpackie Voivodeship, Poland	2003	1053rev: iii, iv (cultural)	The wooden church style of the region originated in the late Medieval, the late sixteenth century, and began with Gothic ornament and polychrome detail, but because they were timber construction, the structure, general form, and feeling is entirely different from the gothic architecture or Polish Gothic (in stone or brick).
Wooden Churches of the Slovak part of the Carpathian Mountain Area		Košice, Banská Bystrica, Žilina and Prešov Regions, Slovakia	2008	1273: iii, iv (cultural)	This site comprises eight wooden churches that were built in the Carpathian area of Slovakia between the 16th and the 18th centuries, as representative examples of wooden religious architecture at the area where communities of three different faiths coexist. Two churches are Roman Catholic, three are Protestant, and three are Greek Orthodox. The Wooden articular church of Hronsek is pictured.
Wooden Tserkvas of the Carpathian Region in Poland and Ukraine*		Poland* and Ukraine*	2013	1424: iii, iv (cultural)	This property comprises 16 wooden churches (tserkvas) in the Carpathians, eight of which are in Ukraine. The churches were built between the 16th and 19th centuries by the communities of Eastern Orthodox and Greek Catholic faiths. The designs are based on the Orthodox ecclesiastical traditions with local influences. They feature wooden bell towers, iconostasis screens, and interior polychrome decorations, as well as churchyards, gatehouses, and graveyards.
Žatec and the Landscape of Saaz Hops	Hops garden, surrounded by buildings	Ústí nad Labem Region, Czechia	2023	1558rev; iii, iv, v (cultural)	Because of favourable weather conditions, the area around the town of Žatec has been used to cultivate hops since the Middle Ages. The hop industry expanded in the 19th century and brought prosperity to the town. Several related buildings date to this period, including the drying houses, packaging halls, and storage buildings, as well as residential houses.
Astronomical Observatories of Kazan Federal University	An astronomical observatory tower and surrounding buildings	Tatarstan, Russia	2023	1678; i, ii, iv, vi (cultural)	This nomination comprises two astronomical observatories. The one at Kazan Federal University was founded in the early 19th century and the one at Engelhardt (pictured) in 1901. They were used to map the positions of stars and objects of the Solar System, as well as to develop astronomical instruments.
Cultural Landscape of Kenozero Lake	A church in an enclosure	Arkhangelsk Oblast, Russia	2024	1688; iii (cultural)	The national park encompasses a cultural landscape that was shaped by farmers through centuries between the 12th and 16th centuries. The area is covered by taiga and there are several lakes, the biggest two being Lake Kenozero and Lake Lyokshmozero. There are several wooden churches (St. George's church from the 18th century in Porzhensky Pogost pictured), chapels, holy crosses, and sacred groves.
Sculptural Ensemble of Constantin Brâncuși at Târgu Jiu		Gorj County, Romania	2024	i, ii (cultural)	The group of monuments at Târgu Jiu was designed by the Romanian sculptor Constantin Brâncuși in 1937 to commemorate the soldiers who died in World War I. There are three sculptures in the assembly, The Table of Silence (Masa tăcerii), The Gate of the Kiss (Poarta sărutului), and the Endless Column (Coloana fără sfârșit), which is depicted in the picture. In the groups of monuments, the old Orthodox church of Targu-Jiu and the houses from the Calea Eroilor are included into UNESCO.
Frontiers of the Roman Empire — Dacia	Ruins of buildings, overgrown with grass	several sites	2024	1718; ii, iii, iv (cultural)	This site comprises the Dacian section of Roman Limes. Stretching over more than 1,000 km (620 mi), this was the longest land Roman border sector of Europe. Around 100 forts, 50 small fortifications, and more than 150 towers in Romania have been identified. Ruins of Micia are pictured.
Cultural Landscape of Kenozero Lake	A church in an enclosure	Arkhangelsk Oblast, Russia	2024	1688; iii (cultural)	The national park encompasses a cultural landscape that was shaped by farmers through centuries between the 12th and 16th centuries. The area is covered by taiga and there are several lakes, the biggest two being Lake Kenozero and Lake Lyokshmozero. There are several wooden churches (St. George's church from the 18th century in Porzhensky Pogost pictured), chapels, holy crosses, and sacred groves.

== Tentative list ==
In addition to sites inscribed on the World Heritage List, member states can maintain a list of tentative sites that they may consider for nomination. Nominations for the World Heritage List are only accepted if the site was previously listed on the tentative list.

Tentative sites
Site	Image	Location	Year listed	UNESCO criteria	Description
Augustow Canal*	River canal, vegetation on both sides	Grodno Region	2004	i, ii (cultural)	The Augustow Canal was built in 1823–1839, to provide a direct link between the two major rivers, Vistula River (through the Biebrza River – a tributary of the Narew River), and the Neman River (through its tributary – the Czarna Hancza River). Furthermore, it provided a link with the Black Sea to the south through the Oginski Canal, Daugava River, Berezina Canal and Dnieper River. It allowed the trade routes to bypass the territory of Eastern Prussia, which had earlier introduced high customs duties for transit of Polish and Lithuanian goods through its territory. Technical heritage of the canal includes locks, weirs, towpaths, as well as roads and bridges. The canal is now located in the territories of Belarus and Poland, thus making the nomination transnational.
Saviour Transfiguration Church and St. Sophia Cathedral in the town of Polatsk	White church with green roof and two bell towers, side view	Vitebsk Region, Belarus	2004	i, ii (cultural)	The Saviour Transfiguration Church was built between 1152 and 1161 in the ancient Rus' style by the order of the princess St. Euphrosyne of Polatsk. From the 16th to the 19th century it was used by the Jesuits. The Saint Sophia Cathedral was originally built in the 11th century, but rebuilt first after the 1447 fire and then in the 18th century after the Great Northern War, this time in the Baroque style. The main facade is embellished with Rococo-style ornamental elements.
SS. Boris and Gleb (Kalozha) Church in the city of Hrodna	Church made of brick and stone, side view	Grodno Region, Belarus	2004	i, ii (cultural)	The church was built in the 1180s in brick and stone. In the following centuries, the church saw series of renovations, as well as a partial collapse due to a landslide of the high bank of the river Nieman, where the church is located. Two walls, three apses, and two pillars remain from the original structure. It is still an active place of worship.
Edifices for Worship of Fortress Type in Belarus, Poland and Lithuania	White and red church with two bell towers, side view	Grodno Region and Vitebsk Region, Belarus	2004	i (cultural)	This nomination currently includes three fortified churches in Belarus, the Church of the Nativity of the Blessed Virgin Mary in Muravanka (pictured), the Church of St. Michael in Synkavichy, and the Church of Saint John the Baptist in Kamai. The churches were built in the 16th and 17th centuries and were often renovated due to the damage following warfare or fires.
Worship wooden architecture (17th–18th centuries) in Polesye	Blue wooden church with a single bell tower in the middle, side view	Brest Region, Belarus	2004	i, ii, iii (cultural)	This nomination covers the wooden architecture in the Polesye region, wood being the main building material for centuries. In the 17th and 18th centuries, two types of the Polesye architectural schools emerged: of the Western Polesye and of the Eastern Polesye. An example is the St. Nikita Church in Zditovo (pictured), which was first built in 1502 and later expanded.
Memorials to the Heroes of the Great Patriotic War: Brest Fortress and Mamayev Kurgan*	Monument to a soldier with a brick fortress in the background	Brest Region, Belarus	2024	ii, iv, vi (cultural)	This nomination comprises two memorial sites to the Great Patriotic War, or the Eastern Front of World War II - Brest Fortress in Belarus and Mamayev Kurgan in Russia. Brest Fortress was the site of the German attack on the Soviet Union in 1941. A memorial complex was constructed in the late 1960s and early 1970s. Artistically, it blends the aesthetics of the Classical antiquity and modern period to display feelings of patriotism, sacrifice, heroism, and grief for the fallen. Both memorial complexes contributed to the development of the heroic Soviet art style which became prominent in socialist countries.
Historical and Cultural Dzheyrakh-Assa Reservation	Stone towers in a mountain landscape	Ingushetia, Russia	1996	(cultural)	The museum-reserve comprises 18 settlements in the canyons of the Assa and Armkhi rivers. The settlements are known for their stone towers (towers in Erzi pictured) that had both residential and defensive functions. Most date from the 16th and 17th centuries.
Historic Centre of Irkutsk	A decorated wooden house in red and white	Irkutsk Oblast, Russia	1998	(cultural)	The city of Irkutsk, located at the Irkut and Angara rivers 66 kilometres (41 mi) from Lake Baikal, has been shaped by its history spanning over 300 years. Founded in 1661 as a military fort, it received many exiles following the 1825 Decembrist revolt. It saw large-scale urbanization in the 20th century. Several buildings from different time periods have been preserved, including traditional decorated wooden houses (example pictured) and buildings in Siberian Baroque.
Rostov Kremlin	Park, church and walls in the background	Yaroslavl Oblast, Russia	1998	ii, iii, iv, vi (cultural)	The Kremlin in the town of Rostov overlooks the Lake Nero. It initially consisted of three parts that were integrated together in the 17th century. The Kremlin contains the Metropolitan residence, several churches, and it is surrounded by high walls. It is one of the best preserved examples of old Russian architecture.
Historic Center of Yeniseysk	An orthodox church	Krasnoyarsk Krai, Russia	2000	ii, iii, iv (cultural)	The town of Yeniseysk was founded in 1619 and served as a base for Russian expansion into East Siberia. Located at the bank of the Yenisey River, it was also an important trade centre. The town preserves several buildings from the 18th and 19th centuries. The Monastery of the Transfiguration of the Savior is pictured.
Petroglyphs of Sikachi-Alyan	A rock with a carved face	Khabarovsk Krai, Russia	2003	(cultural)	Petroglyphs dating to the prehistoric times are located on cliffs above the Amur River near the village of Sikachi-Alyan. They were noticed by the Russian orientalist Palladius in the late 19th century and were further studied in the 20th century.
The Commander Islands (Comandorsky State Nature Reserve)	Hilly scenery with a river, low vegetation	Kamchatka Krai, Russia	2005	vii, viii, ix, x (natural)	The nature reserve comprises two large islands (Bering Island and Medny Island, pictured), a group of smaller islands, and the surrounding waters. The islands are the peaks of a submarine volcanic ridge extending from Alaska to Kamchatka. The islands are an important habitat for birds and sea mammals.
Magadansky State Nature Reserve	Coast and forest, photo from above	Magadan Oblast,Russia	2005	vii, viii, ix, x (natural)	The reserve consists of four clusters, three of which are at or near the coast of the Sea of Okhotsk and the fourth is further inland. The climate in the area is subarctic. The forests consist mainly of conifers and there are several endemic plant species. The rivers are important for migrating species of salmons.
Krasnoyarsk Stolby	A large rock formation in a forest	Krasnoyarsk Krai, Russia	2007	vii, viii, ix, x (natural)	The stolby (rocks) are rock formations in the Eastern Sayan Mountains. The rocks date to the Paleozoic era, they are of magmatic and sedimentary origin, and contain fossils from the Cambrian period. There are also karst phenomena, such as caves, present. The area is popular with rock climbers, who call the freestyle mountaineering "stolbism".
The Great Vasyugan Mire	Aerial shot of the forest with rivers weaving between some trees	Tomsk Oblast, Russia	2007	vii, viii, ix, x (natural)	Vasyugan Mire is the largest swamp in the Northern Hemisphere, and is located around the Ob and Irtysh watershed. It developed recently, in the Holocene epoch. The landscape contains peat bogs, fens, and forested mires. The swamp supports large number of insect species, which are in turn food for a large number of migrating and nesting birds. Mammal species present include elk, brown bear, lynx, and sable.
Ensemble of the Astrakhan Kremlin	An orthodox church and a bell tower with green roof	Astrakhan Oblast, Russia	2008	ii, iii, iv (cultural)	Following the conquest of the Astrakhan Khanate by Ivan the Terrible, the kremlin of Astrakhan was constructed in 1558, first in wood and then in stone in the following decades. It served as a stronghold in the south-eastern border of Russia and a stop on the Silk Road. The Assumption Cathedral (pictured) is considered as one of the best examples of Russian church architecture of the 18th century.
The Ilmensky mountains	Forest scenery	Chelyabinsk Oblast, Russia	2008	vi, vii, viii (natural)	The mountains contain rich deposits of a wide variety of minerals, some of which were first discovered here. They include ilmenite, monazite, cancrinite, and samarskite-(Y). The area is protected as Ilmen Nature Reserve and generally closed to public.
The archeological site of Tanais	Ruins of some buildings	Rostov Oblast, Russia	2009	ii, iii, v (cultural)	Tanais was a colony of Bosporan Kingdom, an ancient Greek state. The city was founded in the 3rd century BCE in the Don river delta and quickly became a strong trade centre and a place of interaction between Greeks and nomadic tribes of the steppe, including the Sarmatians. In the 3rd century CE, Tanais was burned down, probably by the Goths. The area remained inhabited but the centre of settlement has moved away from the city ruins in the following centuries.
Bashkir Ural	Cave painting depicting mammoths	Bashkortostan, Russia	2012	i, iii, v, vi, viii, x (mixed)	The area in the south part of the Ural Mountains is important both in natural and cultural view. It is rich in biodiversity, being at the meeting point of European and Asian forests and steppes. There are several karst phenomena, including caves. Cave paintings from the Paleolithic have been find in Kapova Cave (pictured). Today, the area is inhabited by the Bashkirs who maintain some ancient traditions, including wild beekeeping.
Virgin Komi Forests (re-nomination)	Forest, river and mountains	Komi Republic, Russia	2014	vii, viii, ix, x (natural)	This nomination proposes a boundary modification of the existing World Heritage Site and a further justification of outstanding natural merit as per UNESCO criteria.
Western Caucasus (re-nomination)	Mountain scenery	Krasnodar Krai, Russia	2014	ix, x (natural)	This nomination proposes a boundary modification of the existing World Heritage Site.
Mamayev Kurgan Memorial Complex "To the Heroes of the Battle of Stalingrad"	Memorial complex with a large sculpture of a woman holding a sword	Volgograd Oblast, Russia	2014	i, iv, vi (cultural)	The complex in Volgograd (formerly Stalingrad) commemorates the fallen during the Battle of Stalingrad of World War II. It was constructed between 1959 and 1967. It consists of several staircases, squares, memorial halls, and is crowned by a huge allegorical statue The Motherland Calls by Yevgeny Vuchetich.
The Oglakhty Range	A funerary mask	Khakassia, Russia	2016	i, iii, vi, x (mixed)	The Oglakhty mountain range is located on the bank of the Yenisei river. The area has been inhabited for at least 5000 years and different cultures left several archaeological remains, including petroglyphs and burial sites of the Tashtyk culture from 1st to 7th century CE (funerary mask from this culture pictured). The landscape includes relatively undisturbed forests and steppes with diverse flora and fauna.
Historic Centre of Gorokhovets	Look at a town from above	Vladimir Oblast, Russia	2017	ii, iv (cultural)	The town of Gorokhovets was founded in the 12th century on the bank of Klyazma river, to protect the southern border of Vladimir-Suzdal. The town saw its golden age in the 17th and 18th centuries when it was an important trade centre. A number of churches and monasteries were built in that period.
Treasures of the Pazyryk Culture	A weaving depicting two persons and a horse	Altai Republic, Russia	2018	i, ii, iii, vi (cultural)	This nomination comprises sites related to the Pazyryk Culture, which was a Scythian nomadic Iron Age archaeological culture from the 6th to 2nd century BCE. Findings include petroglyphs, burial mounds with preserved mummies showing tattoos, as well as remains of textiles (carpet pictured). Some sites are located in the buffer zone of the Golden Mountains of Altai World Heritage Site.
Rock Painting of Shulgan-Tash Cave	Cave painting depicting mammoths	Bashkortostan, Russia	2018	i, iii (cultural)	Cave paintings in the Shulgan-Tash, or Kapova Cave, date to the Upper Paleolithic period. They were made in red ochre and depict mammoths, woolly rhinoceroses, bulls, and horses. The cave was occupied for several thousands of years and likely served ritual purposes. It was rediscovered in the mid-20th century.
Cathedral of the Transfiguration of the Savior with the Medieval Rampart City Wall of Pereslavl-Zalessky (1152–1157)	A white orthodox church with a green roof	Yaroslavl Oblast, Russia	2019	i, ii, iv (cultural)	The Transfiguration Cathedral is the earliest preserved example of Russian white-stone architecture. The design was influenced by the Romanesque style from Western Europe and by Byzantine Empire tradition. The town of Pereslavl-Zalessky was founded by Prince Yuri Dolgorukiy in 1152 and was surrounded by earthen ramparts which are still preserved today.
Heritage of Chukotka Arctic Marine Hunters	Some abandoned houses at the shore, snow around	Chukotka Autonomous Okrug, Russia	2019	ii, iii, v, vi (cultural)	This nomination comprises three sites related to the Siberian Yupik (also called Eskimo) people inhabiting the far north of Chukotka. The cemetery complex at Ekven dates from the first millennium AD, the village of Naukan and the complex at Nunak were active from the 15th to the 19th or 20th century. Remains of the Old Bering Sea culture include tools, hunting weapons, household items, and jewellery. Hunters mostly focused on marine mammals and used animal bones to make tools and decorative bone carvings.
Vyatskoe village	A decorated wooden house and a fence in front	Yaroslavl Oblast, Russia	2019	ii, v (cultural)	The village of Vyatskoe was first mentioned in 1502 but mostly developed in the 18th century. The architecture has been well preserved, including merchant and peasant houses, churches, and public buildings. There are several thematic museums. The villagers have preserved traditional crafts, including the production of pickled cucumbers.
Divnogorye Historical and Cultural Complex	An orthodox church made out of a rock formation	Voronezh Oblast, Russia	2020	ii, iv, v, vi (cultural)	Divnogorye is a chalk and limestone landscape on the bank of the Don river. It has been inhabited since the Upper Paleolithic, when horse hunting took place in the area. In the 9th and 10th centuries, it was a site of a fortified Khazar settlement of Saltovo-Mayaki culture. In the 18th and 19th centuries, the area attracted hermits who carved caves and churches into soft rock (Cave monastery of St. John the Baptist pictured).
National Park Kytalyk	A small plant flowering	Sakha, Russia	2021	ix, x (natural)	National park Kytalyk covers parts of the Kolyma Lowland and Yana-Indigirka Lowland and consists of tundra landscape with thermokarst features such as polygonal soils, baydzharakh, and pingos. The area is home to the endangered Siberian crane, as well as several species of ducks and geese.
Valley of the Kings of Tuva	Circular burial mounds from above	Tuva, Russia	2021	i, iii, iv (cultural)	The valley of the Uyuk river is the site of thousands of burial mounds (kurgans). They are either stone or earthen and date to the 1st millennium BCE, during the Bronze and Iron Age of the early Scythian cultures. The archaeological studies of the site started in 1915. Some mounds are massive, Arzhaan-1 was originally 120 metres (390 ft) in diameter and 4 metres (13 ft) tall. Thousands of gold objects were discovered in Arzhaan-2 (pictured from above) and are now stored in museums.
Denisova Cave	Entrance to a cave, surrounded by trees	Altai Krai, Russia	2022	iii, v (cultural)	Denisova cave is an archaeological site with remains of Pleistocene communities, with deposits spanning 300,000 years. It was at different times inhabited by Neanderthals, modern humans, and Denisovans, a group of archaic humans that were identified in 2010 by genetic analysis of the bone fragments found in the cave. Subsequent analyses also demonstrated that Denisovans occasionally interbred with Neanderthals, and that they contributed to the genetic pool of the Tibetan people and to populations of South, East, and Southeast Asia.
Bashkir Shikhans: Toratau, Yuraktau and Kushtau	A white conical hill in a flat landscape, partially covered by forest	Bashkortostan, Russia	2022	viii (natural)	This nomination comprises three shikhans, isolated carbonate hills, that are the remains of an ancient reef that formed during the Permian period. They formed at the junction of two ancient oceans, Tethys and Panthalassa, in the final stages before the formation of the Pangaea. They document all the stages of the reef development, from its formation to extinction. Diverse fossil communities include bryozoa, brachiopods, molluscs, and trilobites. Toratau is pictured.
The Complex of the Voskresensky Copper Smeltery	Remains of an old industrial building in red brick	Bashkortostan, Russia	2023	ii, iv, v (cultural)	The copper smelting industrial complex was established in 1740s as the first private enterprise in the region. The complex later expanded to include iron smelters and foundries. The plant was one of the largest in the Ural Mountains and stimulated development of mining plants in Orenburg Oblast. It ceased operating in 1902. Today, the complex is the best preserved example of a copper smelting plant, with 12 remaining objects, including industrial buildings, a church, a hospital, and warehouses.
Historic Town Centre of Torzhok and Country Estate Properties Designed by Nikolay Lvov	A Neoclassical Orthodox monastery	Tver Oblast, Russia	2023	i, iv, vi (cultural)	Torzhok is one of the oldest Russian towns and it is located on the route from Moscow to Saint Petersburg. After a 1766 fire that destroyed the centre, the town was rebuilt in Neoclassical style. The reconstruction was headed by the architect Nikolay Lvov, who drew from the ideas of the Italian Renaissance architect Andrea Palladio. One of his works is the Borisoglebskiy Cathedral (pictured). Lvov's work was continued by other architects, including Carlo Rossi.
Memorials to the Heroes of the Great Patriotic War: Brest Fortress and Mamayev Kurgan*	Monument depicting a woman with a sword in the background, a pond with a Cyrillic inscription at the side in front	Volgograd Oblast, Russia	2024	ii, iv, vi (cultural)	This nomination comprises two memorial sites to the Great Patriotic War, or the Eastern Front of World War II - Brest Fortress in Belarus and Mamayev Kurgan in Russia. The latter commemorates the Battle of Stalingrad which turned the tides of the war in favour of the Allies. It was constructed between 1959 and 1967 and features the monumental sculpture The Motherland Calls (pictured in the background). Both memorial complexes contributed to the development of the heroic Soviet art style which became prominent in socialist countries.
Complex of Structures of the Tsoi-Pede Necropolis	A tower upon a hill with stone buildings below it	Chechnya, Russia	2024	ii (cultural)	The site consists of
Two neolithic dwellings with their interior and household furnishings and utensils completely preserved		Stara Zagora Province, Bulgaria	1984	iii, iv (cultural)	This nomination covers two neolithic dwellings, dating to the 6th millennium BCE, now located in the city of Stara Zagora. They are remarkably well preserved, the best in the world from that period. Several household appliances were found on the site, including ceramics, ornaments, stone tools, hand grinders, and there are preserved furnaces. A dedicated museum has now been constructed above the site to allow visitor access.
The Magoura cave with drawings from the Bronze Age	Wall drawings depicting humans and animals	Vidin Province, Bulgaria	1984	(cultural)	The cave, located near the village of Rabisha, has several accessible halls and galleries. It was occupied during the Bronze Age and early Iron Age. Remnants of settlements have been preserved in the cave, as well as wall drawings that were likely ritual in nature.
The ancient town of Nicopolis ad Istrum	Ruins of a gate and a street	Veliko Tarnovo Province, Bulgaria	1984	iii, iv (cultural)	The town was founded by the Roman Emperor Trajan at the beginning of the 2nd century CE, after the Dacian Wars. The town had an orthogonal plan and was surrounded by fortified walls. They minted their own coins. During the Byzantine period, the town was an episcopal centre, until it was ultimately destroyed by the Avars in the late 6th century.
The late ancient tomb of Silistra	A small building in stone	Silistra Province, Bulgaria	1984	i, iii (cultural)	This Roman tomb, dating to the 4th century CE, is located in the town of Silistra. It is a rare well-preserved example of late ancient painting, with walls entirely covered in murals in the fresco-secco technique. A frieze running along the walls of the tomb contains 11 panels featuring the portraits of male and female slaves bringing various gifts and garments to the masters.
The Bachkovo Monastery	Inner courtyard of the monastery	Plovdiv Province, Bulgaria	1984	i, iv, vi (cultural)	The monastery was founded in the 11th century and is one of the oldest monasteries in the Balkans. It represents a unique combination of three cultures during the Middle Ages: Bulgarian, Byzantine, and Georgian. The ossuary remains from the original monastery, while the Church of the Holy Archangels was constructed between the 12th and 14th centuries and the reflectory in the 17th century. Several murals have been preserved in the monastery, from different periods.
The town of Melnik and the Rozhen Monastery	Rozhen Monastery with hills in the background	Blagoevgrad Province, Bulgaria	1984	i, iv (cultural)	This nomination comprises the medieval town of Melnik, the fortress above it, and the nearby monastery. They are located in a setting surrounded by natural sand pyramids. The monastery was founded in the Middle Ages and has preserved portions built from the 16th to the 19th centuries, with murals and wooden altars.
The Roussensky Lom National Park	Forest above the canyon	Ruse Province, Bulgaria	1984	(natural)	The canyon of the Rusenski Lom river is home to several bird species, such as the saker falcon, Egyptian vulture, golden eagle, and long-legged buzzard.
The Ancient Plovdiv	Partially reconstructed Roman theatre, view at the stage	Plovdiv Province, Bulgaria	2004	ii, iv, vi (cultural)	The city of Plovdiv is located on an important corridor crossing the Balkans. The site has been inhabited since prehistory. Among the city's monuments, there are a Roman theatre (pictured) and stadium from classical antiquity, remains from the medieval period, houses in the Ottoman style, and buildings in the style of the Bulgarian National Revival.
Thracian Tomb with Wall Paintings beside Alexandrovo village	Fresco depicting boar hunting	Haskovo Province, Bulgaria	2004	i, ii, iii (cultural)	The Thracian tomb, near the Aleksandrovo village, was constructed in the second half of the 4th century BCE. Both the antechamber and main chamber are decorated with well-preserved frescos. The scenes depict boar and deer hunting.
Vratsa Karst Nature Reserve	Rocky scenery	Vratsa Province, Bulgaria	2011	vii, viii, ix, x (natural)	The reserve, situated in the western part of the Balkan Mountains, features several karst formations, such as sinkholes, gorges, and caves. The cliffs of the Vratsata Gorge reach 450 m (1,480 ft) high. The area is also an important spot for biodiversity, with Mediterranean and sub-Mediterranean plant species growing on limestone terrain, far from the Mediterranean basin borders.
Rocks of Belogradchik	Rock formations	Vidin Province, Bulgaria	2011	vii, viii (natural)	This nomination comprises sandy and calcareous rock formations near the town of Belogradchik. Some of the formations are over 20 m (66 ft) tall. They come in different shapes that people have likened to human figures or animals.
Central Balkan National Park	Trees in front, snow-covered mountains in the back	Lovech, Gabrovo, Sofia, Plovdiv, and Stara Zagora provinces; Bulgaria	2011	vii, viii, ix, x (natural)	The national park covers a 85 km (53 mi) stretch of the Balkan Mountains. It comprises a variety of habitats, including forests, meadows, mountain pastures, and rocky peaks up to 2,376 m (7,795 ft) high. The area contains several primeval European beech (Fagus sylvatica) forests and is home to several endemic plant species.
Pobiti Kamani Natural Monument	Rock formations	Varna Province, Bulgaria	2011	vii, viii (natural)	This nomination comprises several groups of calcareous rock formations, created by the erosion processes from the Eocene sediments. They are located along the Black Sea coast in a desert-like landscape. A theory proposes that some of the structures were formed around natural methane seeps.
The royal necropolis of the Thracian city of Seuthopolis – a serial site, extension of the Kazanlak Thracian tomb	Tomb entrance, in stone	Stara Zagora Province, Bulgaria	2016	i, ii, iii, iv (cultural)	This nomination represents an extension to the existing World Heritage Site Thracian Tomb of Kazanlak. Eight tombs are listed in the nomination. They are part of a necropolis located near the ancient Thracian city Seuthopolis, the capital of king Seuthes III. They date to the 4th and 3rd centuries BCE and display a mixture of Thracian and Hellenistic influences. The Thracian tomb Golyama Arsenalka is pictured.
Bishop's Basilica and Late-Antique Mosaics of Philippopolis, Roman Province of Thrace	Mosaic depicting birds at a fountain	Plovdiv Province, Bulgaria	2018	ii, iii, iv, vi (cultural)	The basilica and two other buildings in this nomination, dating from the 2nd to the 6th century, were located in the city of Philippopolis (today's Plovdiv), an important city of the Roman Empire. The floor mosaics in the basilica, that have been uncovered from the 1980s on, represent some of the largest collections of early Christian mosaics preserved in situ.
Frontiers of the Roman Empire – The Danube Limes (Bulgaria)*	Ruins, brick arch	several sites	2020	ii, iii, iv (cultural)	This is a transnational nomination covering sites with Roman fortifications along the Danube river. The ruins at Ratiaria are pictured.
Historic Centre of Tchernigov, 9th—13th centuries	A white church in orthodox style	Chernihiv Oblast, Ukraine	1989	i, ii, iv (cultural)	This nomination comprises the historic centre of Tchernigov, or Chernihiv, that dates to the 9th—13th centuries. The nomination mentions the Transfiguration Cathedral from the 11th century and the Borysohlibskyi Cathedral from the 12th century (pictured).
Cultural Landscape of Canyon in Kamenets-Podilsk	Look at a castle with many towers from afar	Khmelnytskyi Oblast, Ukraine	1989	i, ii, iv (cultural)	This nomination comprises the castle (pictured) and the historic centre of the city Kamianets-Podilskyi, dating from the 11th to the 18th centuries.
Tarass Shevtchenko Tomb and State Historical and Natural Museum - Reserve	Old house, surrounded by trees	Cherkasy Oblast, Ukraine	1989	(mixed)	No description provided in the nomination documentation
National Steppe Biosphere Reserve "Askaniya Nowa"	A herd of Przewalski's horses running in a steppe	Kherson Oblast, Ukraine	1989	x (natural)	No description provided in the nomination documentation
Dendrological Park "Sofijivka"	A bridge over a stream in a park	Cherkasy Oblast, Ukraine	2000	(mixed)	The construction of the English landscape park was started in 1796 by Stanisław Szczęsny Potocki. It is a representative example of the landscape gardening architecture at the turn of the 18th century and is home to over two thousand plant species. Since 1955, it has been managed by the National Academy of Sciences of Ukraine.
Bagçesaray Palace of the Crimean Khans	A view of the palace, with chimneys and minarets	AR Crimea, Ukraine	2003	i, iii, v, vi (cultural)	The palace was constructed in the first half of the 16th century in the local period style. It served as the residence of Crimean Khans for around 250 years. The complex comprises two mosques, official buildings, living quarters of the Khans and their families, as well as auxiliary buildings, inner courtyards and parks.
Archaeological Site "Stone Tomb"	A stone mound	Zaporizhzhia Oblast, Ukraine	2006	iii, vi (cultural)	This archaeological site encompasses a large mound, up to 12 metres (39 ft) tall, made up of individual sandstone blocks. There are several petroglyphs on the stones, some dating to the Neolithic period while most were created in the Bronze Age. Remains of settlements from the Mesolithic and Neolithic periods have been found in the area.
Mykolayiv Astronomical Observatory	Observatory main building	Mykolaiv Oblast, Ukraine	2007	ii, iv (cultural)	The observatory in Mykolaiv was founded in 1821 as a naval observatory. The complex comprises the Classicist main building, astronomic pavilions from the early 20th century, and three modern pavilions that are in use for research.
Complex of the Sudak Fortress Monuments of the 6th – 16th c.	Fortress walls on a rocky mount	AR Crimea, Ukraine	2007	ii, iv, v (cultural)	The fortifications at Sudak, or Sugdeia, were constructed by the Byzantines in the Early Middle Ages and then by the Genoese who built most of the extant structures in the 14th and 15th centuries. Sudak declined in importance in the 17th century and the fortress became a museum in 1958.
Astronomical Observatories of Ukraine*	A white observatory	Mykolaiv Oblast, Kyiv, Odesa Oblast, AR Crimea; Ukraine	2008	ii, iv, vi (cultural)	This transnational nomination brings together important astronomical observatories. Four observatories from the 19th and 20th centuries in Ukraine are included in the nomination: Mykolaiv Observatory, Astronomical Observatory of Kyiv National University, Astronomical Observatory of Odesa National University, and Crimean Astrophysical Observatory (pictured).
Kyiv: Saint Sophia Cathedral with Related Monastic Buildings, St. Cyril's and St. Andrew's Churches, Kyiv-Pechersk Lavra (extension of Kyiv: Saint-Sophia Cathedral and Related Monastic Buildings, Kyiv-Pechersk Lavra)	St. Andrew's church, a Baroque building on the top of a hil	Kyiv, Ukraine	2009	i, ii, iii, iv (cultural)	This nomination considers the addition of two churches to the existing World Heritage Site in Kyiv. St. Cyril's Monastery is an important example of Kievan Rus' architecture. It was founded in the 12th century. The interior of the church has been largely preserved while the exterior has been renovated in Ukrainian Baroque style in the 17th and 18th centuries. St. Andrew's Church (pictured) was built in the mid-18th century following the designs of Francesco Bartolomeo Rastrelli. It is a rare example of Elizabethan Baroque in Ukraine.
Trading Posts and Fortifications on Genoese Trade Routes. From the Mediterranean to the Black Sea*	Sudak fortress on the top of a hill	AR Crimea, Ukraine	2010	ii, iv (cultural)	This transnational nomination brings together some of the most significant sites of maritime and mercantile settlements distributed around the Mediterranean and the Black Sea that were part of the trade network of Republic of Genoa between the 11th and 15th centuries. In Ukraine, the fortress in Sudak is nominated.
Cultural Landscape of "Cave Towns" of the Crimean Gothia	Ruins of Mangup	AR Crimea, Ukraine	2012	iii, v, vi, vii (mixed)	This nomination comprises two medieval settlements of Crimean Goths, Mangup (pictured) and Eski-Kermen, as well as the surroundings with limestone formations and man-made caves. The Goths settled the area in the 3rd to 4th centuries and allied with the Byzantine Empire in the 6th century. Mangup was their capital. The Principality of Theodoro formed in the area in the 14th century and was ultimately destroyed by the Ottomans in 1475.
The historical surroundings of Crimean Khans' capital in Bakhchysarai	Caves in the ruins of the old city of Chufut-Kale	AR Crimea, Ukraine	2012	ii, iii, v, vi (cultural)	This nomination comprises the Khan's palace and fortress of Chufut-Kale (ruins pictured), their surroundings, as well as historic buildings of Salachik and Eski-Yurt neighborhoods. The palace was constructed in the first half of the 16th century and served as the residence of Crimean Khans for around next 250 years. The area around Chufut-Kale was home to Alans from the 6th to the 15th century. It served as the first capital of Crimean Tatars in the 14th century. Between the 17th and 19th centuries, Crimean Karaites became the largest ethnic group in the city. Most of the archaeological remains are from this period.
Derzhprom (the State Industry Building)	A constructivist building complex from above	Kharkiv Oblast, Ukraine	2017	iv (cultural)	Derzhprom, or the State Industry Building, is located at the side of the Freedom Square in Kharkiv. Built in the 1920s, it is the world's largest building in constructivist style. It was designed by architects S.S. Serafnnov, M.D. Feldher, and S.M. Kravets. Derzhprom made modernism the main architectural style of the Soviet Union for several years.
Tyras - Bilhorod (Akkerman), on the way from the Black Sea to the Baltic Sea	Fortress at the waterfront	Odesa Oblast, Ukraine	2019	ii, iv, vi (cultural)	This nomination comprises the Bilhorod-Dnistrovskyi fortress and the ruins of Tyras. The Greek colony of Tyras was established in the 6th century BCE on the banks of the Dniester Estuary. Through centuries, it served as an important trade port, with routes connecting to the Silk Road, the Baltic, and the Mediterranean. The fortress of the city is the largest in Ukraine and preserves sections from the Genoese, Moldavian, and Ottoman periods. The city, now known as Bilhorod-Dnistrovskyi, was shaped by numerous communities that lived there through centuries.
Gdansk – Town of Memory and Freedom	Gdansk waterfront and an old-style ship in the channel	Pomerania, Poland	2005	ii, iv, vi (cultural)	The city of Gdańsk has witnessed some of the key events in European history, including the first battle of World War II at Westerplatte and the beginning of the Solidarity movement in the Gdańsk Shipyard. Furthermore, the historic Main Town features a number of buildings in Gothic and Renaissance styles.
Augustów Canal*	River canal with a lock	Podlaskie, Poland	2006	(cultural)	The Augustów Canal was built in 1823–1839, to provide a direct link between the two major rivers, Vistula River through the Biebrza River – a tributary of the Narew River, and the Neman River through its tributary – the Czarna Hańcza River, and it provided a link with the Black Sea to the south through the Oginski Canal, Daugava River, Berezina Canal and Dnieper River. It allowed the trade routes to bypass the territory of East Prussia, which had earlier introduced high customs duties for transit of Polish and Lithuanian goods through its territory. Technical heritage of the canal includes locks, weirs, towpaths, as well as roads and bridges. The canal is now located in the territories of Belarus and Poland, thus making the nomination transnational.
The Dunajec River Gorge in the Pieniny Mountains	River gorge, surrounded by tree-covered mountains	Lesser Poland, Poland	2006	(natural)	The Dunajec River Gorge in the Pieniny National Park is rich in flora and fauna. As the Pieniny Mountains were not glaciated, the site can be used to study the evolution of vegetation since the Last Glacial Maximum.
Modernist Centre of Gdynia – the example of building an integrated community	White building in modernist style in the back, waterfront with sailing boats in front	Pomerania, Poland	2019	ii, iv, v (cultural)	After World War I, the city of Gdańsk received the status of a Free City, thus the Polish state could not use it as a port. The nearby village of Gdynia was conceived as the new primary economy hub and a modernist city centre was built as its core in the 1920s and 1930s. In that time, the population grew from 1200 to 120,000 and the city became a symbol of modernisation and the maritime ambitions of the young state.
European Paper Mills (from the era of hand-made paper)*	Red museum building with a dark wooden roof, surrounded by a fence	Lower Silesia, Poland	2024	ii, iii, iv (cultural)	This transnational nomination comprises six 16th–18th century paper mills that show the importance of Europe in paper production. The Duszniki-Zdrój Paper Mill is nominated in Poland, which was previously an individual tentative site (2019–2024).
Renaissance Houses at Slavonice	Houses with sgraffito facades	South Bohemian Region, Czechia	2001	i, ii, iv (cultural)	The town of Slavonice was founded at the crossing of important trade routes and rose to prominence when the post office was established there in 1530. It declined from the 18th century on, which resulted in the preservation of burgher houses in Late Gothic and Renaissance styles with very little alteration. Several houses feature facade decorations in the sgraffito technique.
Fishpond Network in the Třeboň Basin	Fish pond at Rožmberk, look from above	South Bohemian Region, Czechia	2001	i, ii, iii, iv, v (cultural)	Fish farming in the area around the town of Třeboň developed in the Middle Ages, after the House of Rožmberk acquired it in 1366. Several fish ponds were constructed, together with the adjacent infrastructure, such as canals and sluice gates. The largest of the ponds is the Rožmberk Pond.
Český ráj (Czech Paradise) Rock Cities	Hrubá Skála rock formations	several locations	2001	(natural)	Český ráj consists of several sites with rock formations of Cretaceous sandstones. Formations at Hrubá Skála are pictured.
Sites of Great Moravia: Slavonic Fortified Settlement at Mikulčice – Church of St. Margaret at Kopčany*	Ruins at Mikulčice Archaeopark	South Moravian Region, Czechia	2001	iii, v (cultural)	Mikulčice was an important fortified settlement of the Slavonic state of Great Moravia in the Early Middle Ages. It was located in the area that now stretches across the borders of Slovakia and the Czech Republic. Foundations of churches, burial sites, and remains of the fortifications have been uncovered at the site. The Church of St. Margaret on the Slovak side dates to the 9th century and underwent renovations in the 13th and 16th centuries.
The Industrial Complexes at Ostrava	Industrial objects at Vítkovice	Moravian-Silesian Region, Czechia	2001	i, iv, v (cultural)	This nomination comprises sites of technical heritage related to the anthracite-based production of iron. The industrial complex in Vítkovice includes coal mines, coking plants, and blast furnaces, and has been for decades one of the most important centres of coal mining and heavy industry in Europe. Industrial activities started in the 1830s, restructuring took place in the 1910s, and the mining operations were terminated in 1993.
The Fortress of Terezín	Little Fortres of Terezín from above	Ústí nad Labem Region, Czechia	2001	i, ii, iv (cultural)	The Fortress of Terezin was constructed in the late 18th century, following the wars between Austria and Prussia. The fortification system consists of two bastion forts connected by entrenchments. During World War II, the Small Fortress served as a Gestapo prison and the Main Fortress as a Jewish Ghetto.
The Spa at Luhačovice	Jurkovič spa house and a fountain in front	Zlín Region, Czechia	2001	i, ii, iii, iv (cultural)	The first spa-related activities at Luhačovice began in the late 18th century and grew over the 19th century. In the first third of the 20th century, several new buildings were constructed following the plans of the architect Dušan Jurkovič, mixing the folk architectural styles with Art Nouveau. A Constructivist Community Centre was built in the 1930s.
The Betlém Rock Sculptures near Kuks	Betlém Rock Sculptures depicting a Biblical scene. Fence and trees in the background.	Hradec Králové Region, Czechia	2001	i, ii, iv (cultural)	This nomination covers the assembly of Baroque sculptures by Matthias Braun. They were commissioned by Franz Anton von Sporck, an art patron, in the early 18th century. The sculptures, named after Betlehem, are located around the hospital and spa complex near the village of Kuks. They are carved into the sandstone boulders and depict Biblical motives, such as the Nativity scene and the Adoration of the Magi. There are also several statues of saints.
Karlštejn Castle	Karlštejn Castle on the top of the hill, view from below	Central Bohemian Region, Czechia	2001	i, ii, iv (cultural)	Karlštejn Castle was constructed in the mid-14th century for Charles IV, Holy Roman Emperor, at that time the King of Bohemia. The castle is built on a rocky ridge. The most prominent feature of the castle is the Great Tower that contains the Chapel of the Holy Cross. The chapel housed the Imperial Regalia and the Bohemian Crown Jewels until 1420. The castle saw several renovations in the following centuries, with the Great Tower being restored to the Gothic look in the 19th century.
Extension of the World Heritage Site "Historic Centre of Prague" with the important Monuments in its Vicinity	The Hvězda Hunting Lodge, a Renaissance villa surrounded by forest	Prague, Czechia	2001	i, ii, iv (cultural)	This nomination proposes the inclusion of three monuments, constructed in different periods, to the existing World Heritage Site: the Modernist Villa Müller, the Břevnov Monastery, founded in the 10th century, and the Renaissance Hvězda Hunting Lodge with its game park (pictured).
Mountain-top Hotel and Television Transmitter Ještěd	Hotel and Television Transmitter Ještěd, view from above	Liberec Region, Czechia	2007	i, ii, iv (cultural)	The hyperboloid structure that comprises a hotel and a television transmitter was designed by the Czech architect Karel Hubáček. It is located on the mountain top of Ještěd, at an elevation of 1,012 metres (3,320 ft). It was constructed from 1966 to 1973 using steel and reinforced concrete.
Old Wastewater Treatment Plant in Prague-Bubeneč	Front view of the plant with two red brick chimneys	Prague, Czechia	2020	ii, iv (cultural)	The sewage plant in Prague is an example of technical heritage from the turn of the 20th century. It was designed by the civil engineer William Heerlein Lindley as a part of the Prague's modern sewerage system. It was constructed from 1901 to 1906 and became operational in the following year. It was operational until 1967, used for sludge management until the 1980s. It was later converted to a museum.
European Paper Mills (from the era of hand-made paper)*		Olomouc Region, Czechia	2024	ii, iii, iv (cultural)	This transnational nomination comprises six 16th–18th century paper mills that show the importance of Europe in paper production. The Velké Losiny Paper Mill is nominated in the Czech Republic, which was previously an individual tentative site (2001–2024).
Le Château-fort médiéval d'Esztergom	Church and fortifications on a hill	Komárom-Esztergom County, Hungary	1993	(cultural)	The medieval castle-fort of Esztergom, built in the 10th and 11th centuries, was the royal seat until 1249. It is the symbol of Hungarian Christianity. It was enlarged in the early Gothic style and later hosted Renaissance artists.
Caves of the Buda Thermal Karst System		Budapest, Hungary	1993	viii (natural)	Six caves under the hill of Buda that are the source of thermal water. The Jozsef-hegy "crystal" cave features one of the largest hydrothermal chambers in the world.
State Stud-Farm Estate of Mezőhegyes	Black horse of Nonius breed	Békés County, Hungary	2000	iii, iv (cultural)	The stud farm was established by Emperor Joseph II in 1784. It is a large scale farm which focuses on three horse breeds: Nonius, Gidran, and the Furioso-North Star. Most of the architectural features at the farm date to the late 18th century.
The Ipolytarnóc Fossils	Entrance to the museum in shape of a tree trunk	Nógrád County, Hungary	2000	vii, viii (natural)	The fossil site was first scientifically studied in 1836. It contains the remains of a shallow sea from late Oligocene and early Miocene. The sediments were covered by volcanic rocks 19 million years ago, which helped to preserve them. Shark teeth, leaf impressions, and petrified trees are among the most important fossils of the site.
System of Fortifications at the Confluence of the Rivers Danube and Váh in Komárno – Komárom*	Fortress wall with a gate	Komárom-Esztergom County, Hungary	2007	i, ii, iv, v (cultural)	The cities of Komárno in Slovakia and Komárom in Hungary are located at the confluence of Danube and Váh rivers. Due to the strategic location, a fortification system has been developed around the area through centuries. The Hungarian part of the site comprises three forts from the late 19th century, Fort Monostor, Fort Csillag, and Fort Igmandi.
Ödön Lechner's independent pre-modern architecture	Museum of Applied Arts building with decorated facade and roof	Budapest, Bács-Kiskun County, Hungary	2008	i, ii, iii, iv (cultural)	This nomination comprises five buildings of Hungarian architect Ödön Lechner, who developed a unique artistic expression by combining Hungarian styles and Eastern ornamentation. He was active in the late 19th and early 20th century. The Museum of Applied Arts in Budapest is pictured.
The Network of Rural Heritage Buildings in Hungary		several sites, Hungary	2017	ii, iii, vi (cultural)	The Hungarian Network of Country Houses was founded in the mid-20th century. It is an ensemble of authentic folk buildings mostly from the 18th to the 20th century and includes several hundreds of houses across the country.
Royal Seats in Esztergom, Visegrád with the former Royal Wood in the Pilis Mountain	Visegrád castle from above	Pest County, Komárom-Esztergom County, Hungary	2017	ii, iii, iv, v (cultural)	The royal castle in Esztergom (the royal seat until 1249) and the Visegrád palace (the royal seat from 1323 to the 1410s) were influenced by art from Italy and France, from the late Gothic to the Renaissance. The Royal Wood was the hunting area and features the remains of royal mansions and monasteries.
Wooden bell-towers in the Upper Tisza-Region	Wooden bell-tower right of a church with a white facade	Szabolcs-Szatmár-Bereg County, Hungary	2017	ii, iii, iv (cultural)	This nomination comprises seven wooden bell-towers that were built in the 17th and 18th centuries. The wood was used as a building material since the area was impoverished during the Ottoman rule and because Christian congregations that were driven out of their earlier churches during the Reformation and Counter-Reformation and needed new places of worship. The adjacent wooden churches have been later either rebuilt in stone or moved to an outdoor village museum. The tower in Nyírbátor, built around 1640, is pictured.
Balaton Uplands Cultural Landscape	Mainson and the park from above	Veszprém County, Zala County, Hungary	2017	iv, v, vii (mixed)	This nomination covers natural and cultural sites around Lake Balaton: Tihany Peninsula, the Tapolca Basin, the Káli Basin, Lake Hévíz, the Festetics Palace of Keszthely (pictured), Georgikon Farm, and the historic quarter of Balatonfüred. A part of the tentative site is protected as the Balaton Uplands National Park.
Gemer and Abov churches with the medieval wall paintings	Interior of an old church with frescos	Banská Bystrica and Košice Regions, Slovakia	1995	iv (cultural)	This nomination comprises ten churches in southern Slovakia. They feature well-preserved murals from the 14th and 15th centuries, painted by vagrant Italian painters of the Giotto school. The Lutheran church of Štítnik is pictured.
Tokaj Wine Region*	Vineyards, hills in the background	Košice Region, Slovakia	2002	ii, iii, v (cultural)	Tokaj Wine Region is a cultural landscape where wine has been produced since the prehistoric times. It borders the region of the same name in Hungary, that has been listed as a World Heritage Site since 2002, as Tokaj Wine Region Historic Cultural Landscape.
Original Meadow – Pasture Sites of Slovakia		62 locations, Slovakia	2002	v (cultural)	This nomination comprises 62 sites across Slovakia that preserve traditional forms of farming, a high landscape diversity, traditional wooden and other original dwellings, and demonstrate significant social and ecological value of the territory.
The Memorial of Chatam Sófer	A concrete memorial with a path leading to it	Bratislava Region, Slovakia	2002	iv, v, vi (cultural)	The Memorial of Chatam Sófer is the burial place of Moses Sofer, a prominent orthodox rabbi from the 19th century, built at the place of a 17th-century Jewish cemetery. The historical cemetery was mostly destroyed with the construction of the road tunnel under Bratislava Castle in 1943 but the graves of important rabbis were preserved.
System of Fortifications at the Confluence of the Rivers Danube and Váh in Komárno – Komárom*	Fortifications, look from above	Nitra Region, Slovakia	2002	i, ii, iv, v (cultural)	The cities of Komárno in Slovakia and Komárom in Hungary are located at the confluence of Danube and Váh rivers. Due to the strategic location, a fortification system has been developed around the area over the centuries. The Slovak part of the site comprises the central fortress, the Palatine line fortifications and the Váh line fortifications.
The concept of the lenticular historical town core of Košice City	Main street in Košice, with a monument and buildings around	Košice Region, Slovakia	2002	ii, iv, v (cultural)	The town of Košice was situated on an important trade route intersection, connecting the East Europe with the West Europe and the Baltic with the Black Sea. The market settlement was founded in the 13th century and grew in prominence in the 14th century. The medieval street plan is preserved, with the middle road gradually widening into the shape of a lens (thus, "lenticular"). A church is located in the widest part of the lens.
Natural Reserves of Tatras Mountain*	Lake Strbske Pleso with Tatra Mountains in the background	Žilina and Prešov Regions, Slovakia	2002	vii, viii, ix, x (natural)	The Tatras are the highest mountain range in the Carpathian Mountains and span the border between Slovakia and Poland. Though currently ice-free, they were covered by glaciers in the Pleistocene epoch. Several glacial landforms are visible, including moraines and glacial lakes. In Slovakia, the area is protected as the Tatra National Park.
Karst Valleys of Slovakia	Two forested mountains	several sites, Slovakia	2002	viii, ix, x (natural)	This nomination covers sites with karst topography in Slovakia. They are well-preserved, with little human impact, and rich in endemic flora and fauna.
Natural and Cultural Landscape of Danube Region	A marsh along the Danube	several sites, Slovakia	2002	(mixed)	This nomination covers sites along the Danube river. The natural component refers to the floodplains and wetland forests, which are important habitats for wildlife. From the cultural perspective, the area has been inhabited since the prehistoric times, with several cultures leaving archaeological remains and monuments.
Fungal Flora of Bukovské Hills	Beech and fir forest in Stuzica	Prešov Region, Slovakia	2002	x (natural)	Bukovské Hills are a flysch mountain range in north-eastern Slovakia. The forests, where the typical tree species are beech, fir, and maple, are rich in fungi and home to several rare species.
Herľany geyser	Geyser, located in the middle of a stonework, erupting	Košice Region, Slovakia	2002	vii (natural)	The geyser in Herľany was artificially activated in the 1870s during the drilling of a well for a nearby spa. The well reaches 400 metres (1,300 ft) underground and connects to an aquifer. The eruptions take place in 32 to 34 hour-intervals and last around 26 minutes.
Sites of Great Moravia: Slavonic Fortified Settlement at Mikulčice – Church of St. Margaret at Kopčany*	Old church built in stone with a modern red roof	Trnava Region, Slovakia	2007	iii, iv, v, vi (cultural)	Mikulčice was an important fortified settlement of the Slavonic state of Great Moravia in the Early Middle Ages. It was located in the area that now stretches across the borders of Slovakia and Czechia. The Church of St. Margaret dates to the 9th century and underwent renovations in the 13th and 16th centuries. The cemetery around the church is home to tombs from the 9th to the 18th centuries.
The Typical Chernozem Soils of the Bălți Steppe	Green field and a river	Bălți, Moldova	2011	v, ix, x (mixed)	Chernozem is one of the most fertile soils. The tentative site comprises five locations around Bălți where long-time field experiments have been carried out for up to 50 years in order to study the impact of different agricultural practices, such as the use of crop rotations or monoculture, as well as different systems of tillage, fertilization, and irrigation on crop yields and soil fertility. The Bălți Steppe was important in the development of the soil science in the 19th century.
Orheiul Vechi Archaeological Landscape	Panorama with a hill and a river, some buildings on the slope	Orhei District, Moldova	2017	ii, v (cultural)	Old Orhei is located on the bank of the Răut river. The area was already settled in the Paleolithic. Remains of a settlement from the Chalcolithic period (Cucuteni–Trypillia culture) have been found, as well as settlements from the Iron Age. In the 13th and 14th century, it was the site of an important Golden Horde town. Following the departure of the Mongols, Orhei developed into one of the most important Moldovan medieval towns. It was abandoned in the 18th century when the inhabitants moved to the nearby village Trebujeni.
The Underground Wineries of Moldova (Cricova and Mileștii Mici)	An underground wine cellar	Chișinău, Ialoveni District, Moldova	2025	iii, iv, v (cultural)	The tradition of wine-making has become popular in Bessarabia since 19th century. The rising demand for Moldovan wine caused local wineries to invent innovative ways of storing the product, which, in 20th century, resulted in the repurposing of former limestone mines into giant underground wine cellars. This nomination includes two underground wineries: Cricova, spanning over 120 km in length, and Mileștii Mici (pictured), extending over 200 km (of which 55 km are in use).
Neamț Monastery	A stone church with tourists around	Neamț County, Romania	1991	i, ii, iv (cultural)	The monastery was founded in the 14th century. The church was built in the late 15th century, during the reign of king Stephen III of Moldavia, and is the most representative example of the Moldavian style of religious architecture. The monastery has been one of the most important regional centres of culture, it had a printing press and a school.
Byzantine and Post-Byzantine Churches in Curtea de Argeș	Church building in white stone	Argeș County, Romania	1991	i, ii, iv (cultural)	Curtea de Argeș was the old capital of Wallachia. The princely court, dating from the 13th to 16th centuries, is now in ruins. The Church of St. Nicholas dates to the 14th century while the Curtea de Argeș Cathedral (pictured), a part of a former monastery, is from the 16th century.
Rupestral Ensemble from Basarabi	Rock carving of a lion	Constanța County, Romania	1991	(cultural)	The rock complex, located near the town of Murfatlar (formerly known as Basarabi) in an old chalk quarry, was converted into a monastic complex from the 10th to the 12th centuries. Several inscriptions are carved to the walls in different scripts, including Greek, Glagolitic, Cyrillic script, and Turkic runes. There are also several carvings depicting Biblical topics.
Cule from Oltenia	A white tower with a wooden roof	several sites, Romania	1991	iv, v (cultural)	Cule (singular: culă; from Turkish kule "tower, turret") are semi-fortified buildings found in the Oltenia (also known as Lesser Wallachia) region. They were built to watch important routes and were used by greater and lesser nobility. The Culă Greceanu is pictured.
Densuș Church	A church built in stone	Hunedoara County, Romania	1991	i, iv (cultural)	The church was built at the latest in the 14th century on the site of a Roman temple, the materials of which were used in the construction. The interior paintings date from the 15th century.
Historic Town of Alba Iulia	Star fort, look from above	Alba County, Romania	1991	iv, v, vi (cultural)	Alba Iulia lies on the site of a 2nd-century CE Roman camp Apulon. The medieval town was surrounded by bastions in the 18th century. Important buildings include the Catholic St. Michael's Cathedral from the 13th century, the Orthodox Coronation Cathedral from 1992, the Prince's Palace and the Batthyaneum Library. The Alba Carolina Citadel, a start fort, is pictured.
Retezat Massif	Mounains and a small lake	Hunedoara County, Romania	1991	(natural)	No description is provided in the nomination documentation.
Pietrosul Rodnei mountain peak	Mounains and some old houses in front	Bistrița-Năsăud County, Romania	1991	(natural)	No description is provided in the nomination documentation.
Sânpetru Formation	Drawing of a pterosaur	Hunedoara County, Romania	1991	(natural)	No description is provided in the nomination documentation. The Sânpetru Formation is a geological deposit from the Late Cretaceous period (Maastrichtian stage), rich in dinosaur and other fossils. Artist's impression of the pterosaur Eurazhdarcho, discovered at the site, is pictured.
Slătioara secular forest		Suceava County, Romania	1991	(natural)	This is a nomination of the Slătioara secular forest that has since been listed as a part of Ancient and Primeval Beech Forests of the Carpathians and Other Regions of Europe.
The Historic Centre of Sibiu and its Ensemble of Squares	Grand Square with some people walking	Sibiu County, Romania	2004	ii, iii, iv, v (cultural)	The first records of Sibiu, founded by Transylvanian Saxons, are from the year 1191. Since 1366, the town has been known as Hermannstadt and was the capital of the Saxon settlement in Transylvania. The Saxon University was founded in the town in the 15th century and in 1543, Sibiu was the centre of the Reformation in the region. Among the prominent architectural features of the town are the three interconnected squares of the Upper Town (Huet, Kleiner Ring, Grosser Ring), as well as a series of buildings in the Gothic, Renaissance, and Baroque styles.
The old villages of Hollókő and Rimetea and their surroundings*	Two old houses with white facades, flower pots in front	Alba County, Romania	2012	v (cultural)	This is a proposed extension to the Hollókő village, which has been listed as a World Heritage site in Hungary since 1987. Rimetea developed in the 17th and 18th centuries and has been deliberately preserved as a living example of rural life before the agricultural revolution of the 20th century. The village has a strong Hungarian community.
Frontiers of the Roman Empire — The Danube Limes (Romania)*	Stone gate with two towers and two arched passes	several sites, Romania	2020	ii, iii, iv (cultural)	This is a transnational nomination covering sites with Roman fortifications along the Danube river. The reconstructed gate at Porolissum is pictured.
Former Communist Prisons in Romania	Some buildings in a fenced prison	several sites, Romania	2024	vi (cultural)	This nomination comprises five former Communist prisons: Jilava (pictured), Râmnicu Sărat, Pitești, Făgăraș, and Sighetu Marmaţiei penitentiaries.
Movile Cave		Constanța County, Romania	2024	viii, ix, x (natural)	The cave is nominated as its aquifer forms a unique, isolated ecosystem shaped by the high concentration of sulfur compounds but little oxygen, with most organisms relying on chemosynthesis to survive.
Princely religious foundations in Wallachia and Moldavia	A mostly white church with two cross-adorned towers	Argeș County and Iași County, Romania	2024	i, ii (cultural)	The nomination combines two churches: the Cathedral Church of The Assumption of Virgin Mary at Curtea de Argeş (a tentative site since 1991) and the Church of the Three Holy Hierarchs at Iaşi (a former tentative site, pictured).
Royal Residences of Sinaia	A Romanian chateau in front of a forest	Prahova County, Romania	2024	ii, iv, vi (cultural)	The nomination comprises parts of Sinaia built during the reign of Carol I, most notably the Peleș Castle (pictured), the Pelișor Castle, and the Foișor Castle.
