= Porzhenka =

River in Arkhangelsk Oblast, Russia

The Porzhenka (Russian: Порженка) is a river, 8 kilometres (5 mi) long, within the Dvina–Pechora watershed district in Russia. The river originates in the Bolshoye Porzhenskoye Lake and flows into Lake Kenozero, which is drained by the Kena towards the Onega. The Porzhensky Pogost is nearby.
