= Vershinino, Plesetsky District, Arkhangelsk Oblast =

Village in Plesetsky District, Arkhangelsk Oblast

Coordinates: 62°4′43″N 38°11′43″E

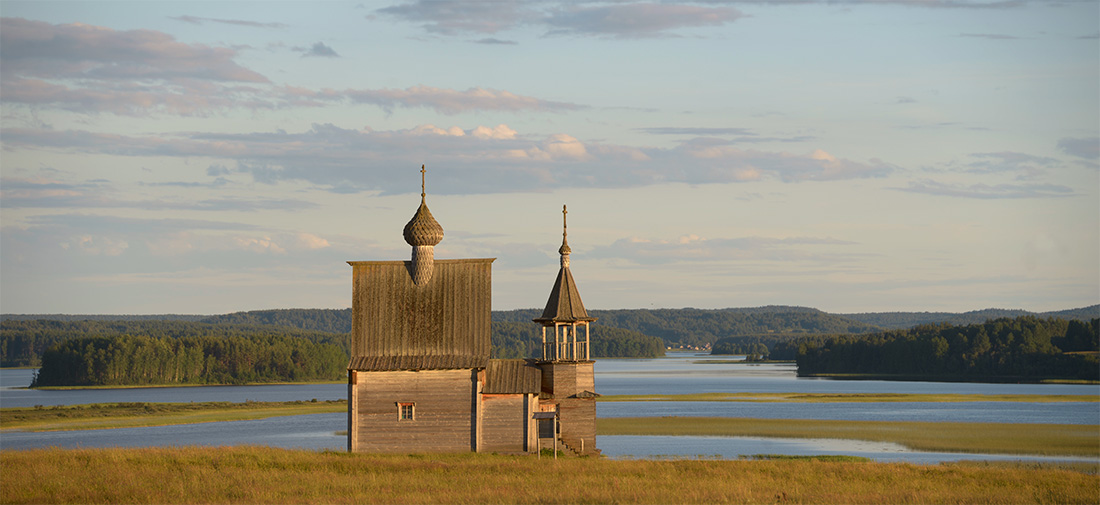
Vershinino

Vershinino (Russian: Вершинино) is a rural locality (a selo) in Plesetsky District of the Arkhangelsk Oblast, Russia. Population: 182 (2010 census); 204 (2002 census); It contains the main office of the Kenozero National Park, one of the World Heritage sites.
