= Yelena Shatkovskaya =

Soviet and Russian scientist (born 1957)

- Еле́на Флего́нтовна Шатко́вская
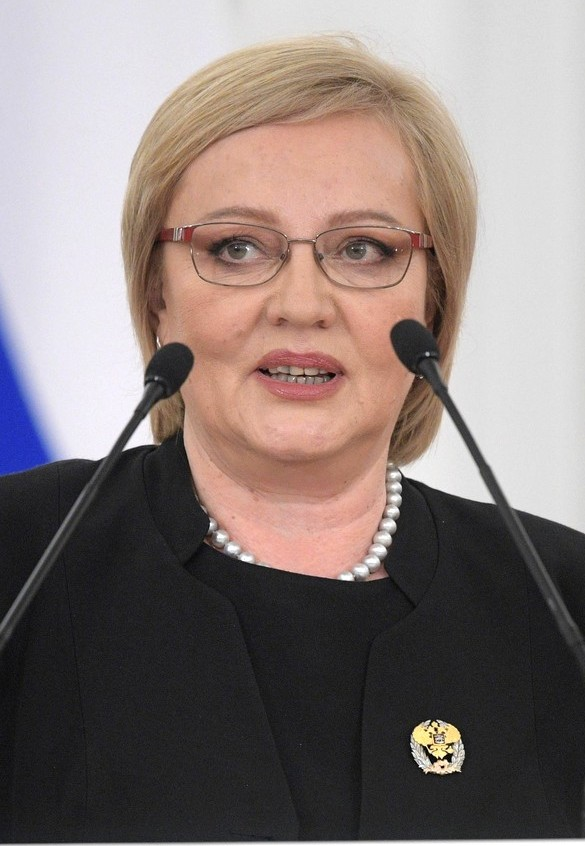
- Born: 15 December 1957 (age 68); Arkhangelsk, RSFSR, Soviet Union
- Citizenship: Russian
- Education: Arkhangelsk State Pedagogical Institute
- Occupation: Director of Kenozersky National Park

Yelena Flekontovna Shatkovskaya (Russian: Еле́на Флего́нтовна Шатко́вская) (born 15 December 1957, Arkhangelsk, RSFSR, USSR) is a Soviet and Russian scientist, the first and only director of the Kenozersky National Park of the Ministry of Natural Resources and Ecology of the Russian Federation since 1991, Honored Worker of Culture of the Russian Federation (2013), honorary citizen of the Arkhangelsk region (2018). In June 2019 Russia Day in a ceremony in the Grand Kremlin Palace she received the State Prize of the Russian Federation for the year 2018 for her contribution to the preservation of the historical, cultural and natural heritage of Russia.
