= Porzhensky Pogost =

Pogost in Kenozersky National Park, Russia

Coordinates: 61°54′37″N 38°6′33″E

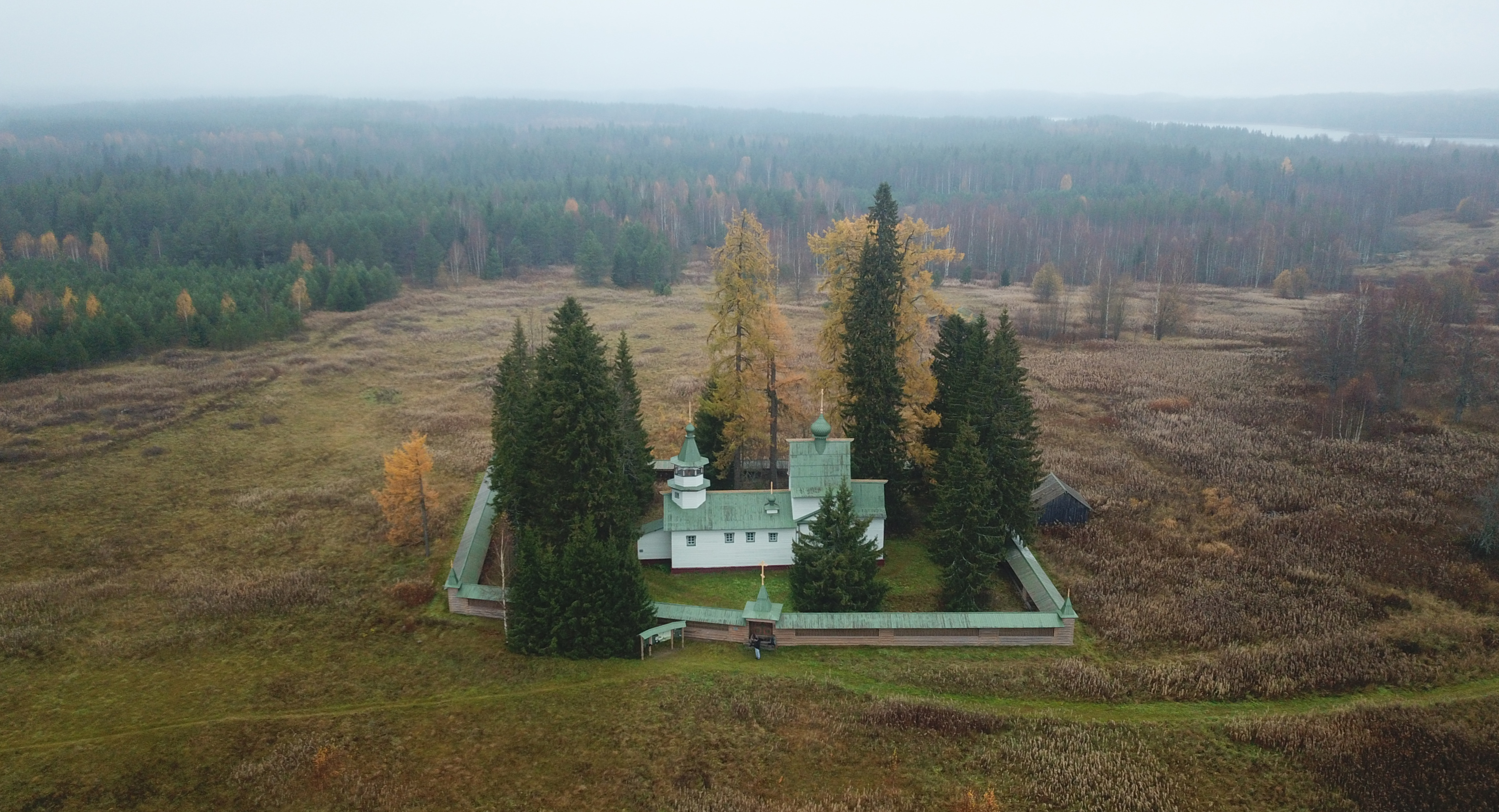
Church of St. George the Victorious 1782 (Porzhensky churchyard)

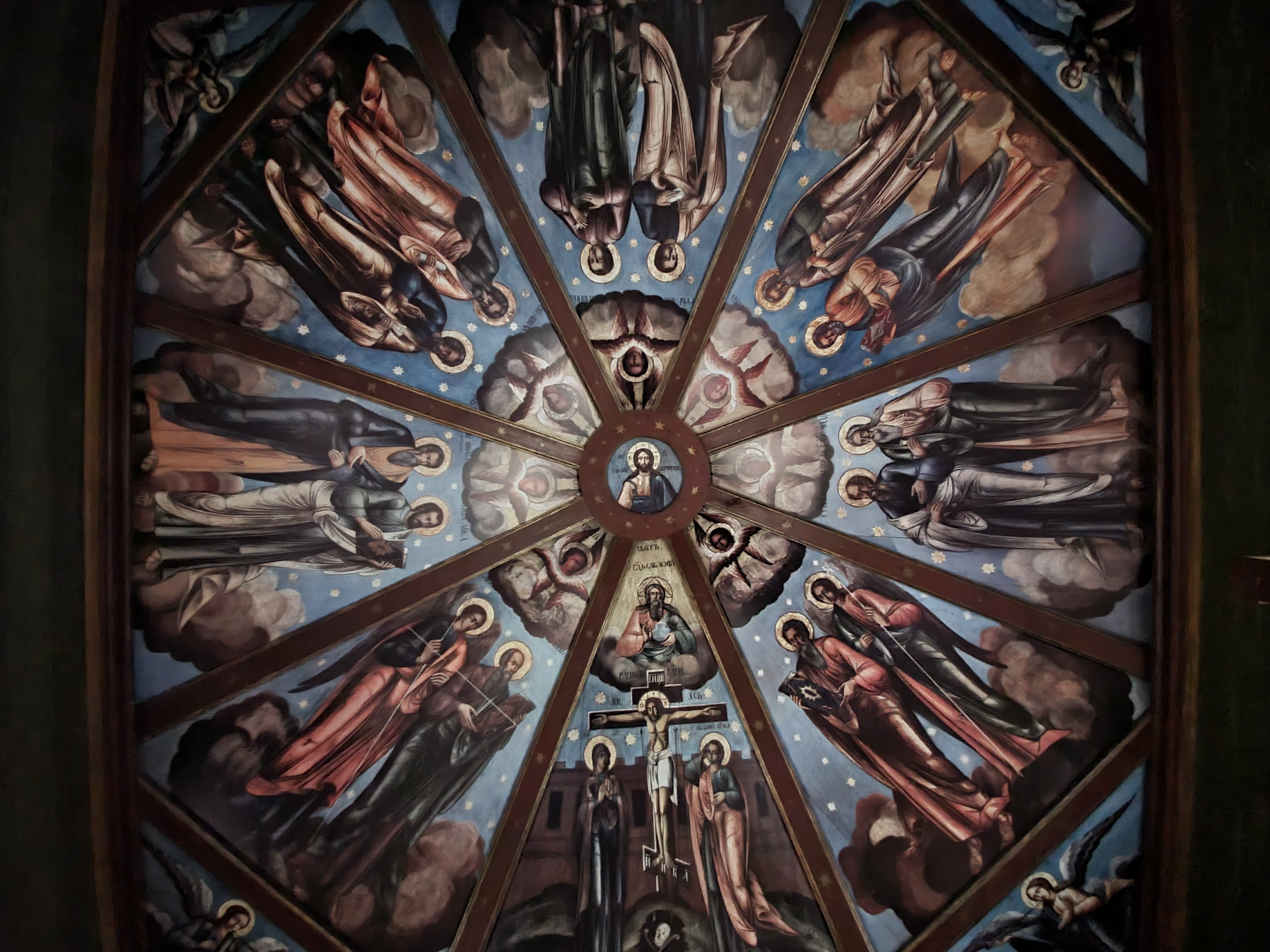
Ceiling painting in the main church

The Porzhensky Pogost (Russian: Порженский погост) is a pogost near the Porzhenka river in Kenozero National Park, Russia, with several wooden religious buildings of 18th century, surrounded by partially preserved fence. Administratively, it is located in Plesetsky District of Arkhangelsk Oblast. The Porzhensky Pogost is located at the outskirts of the abandoned village of Porzhenskoye, on top of a hill, in the center of a small field. The pogost was built on a secluded pagan site and includes an 18th-century church with a bell tower, emulating the Russian architectural style of the 16th–17th centuries.

The pogost was designated by the Russian government as an architectural monument of federal significance (#2910079000).
