= Lake Lyokshmozero =

Lake in Arkhangelsk Oblast, Russia

Lake Lyokshmozero Лёкшмозеро
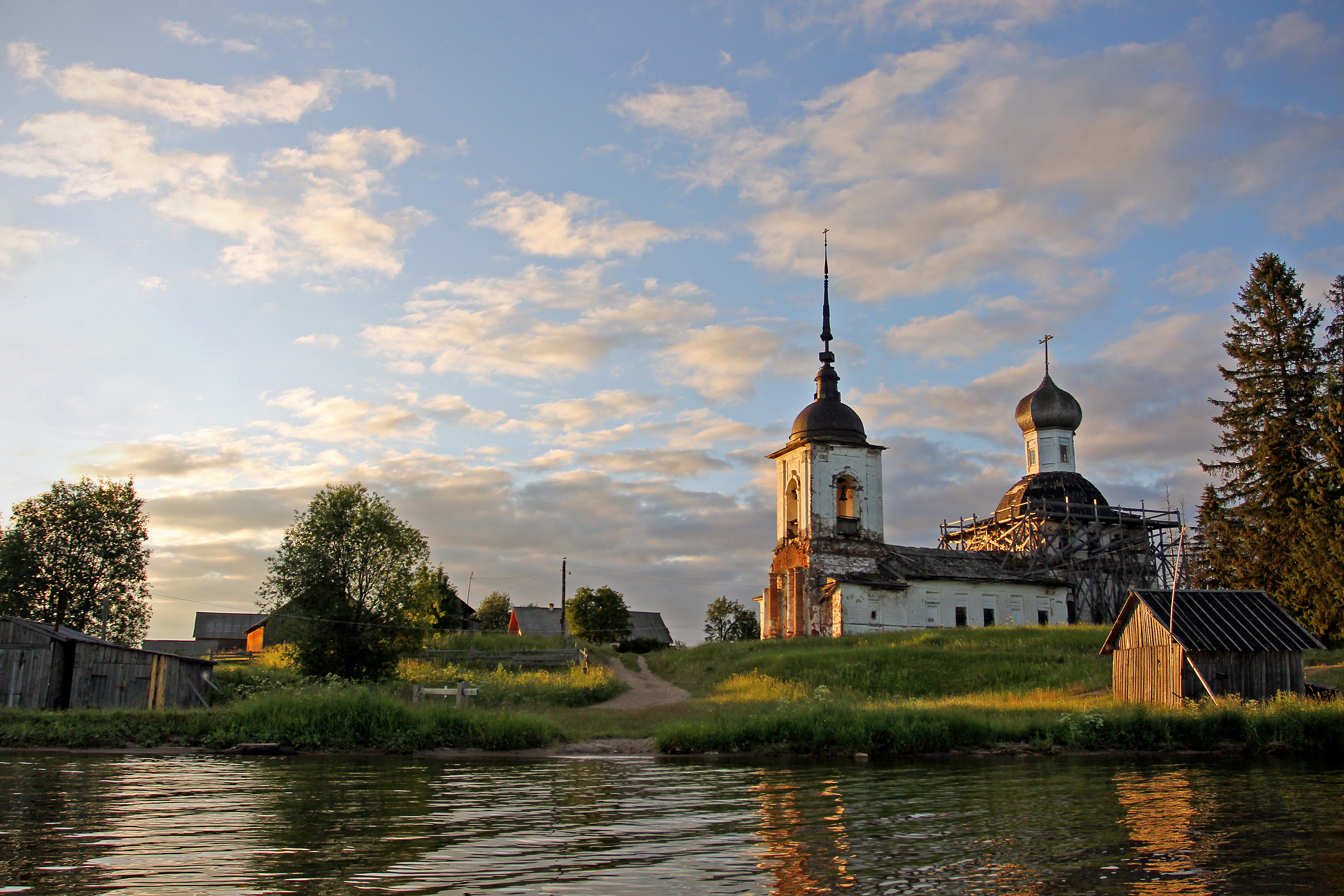
- Sts Peter and Paul Church in the village of Morshchikhinskaya

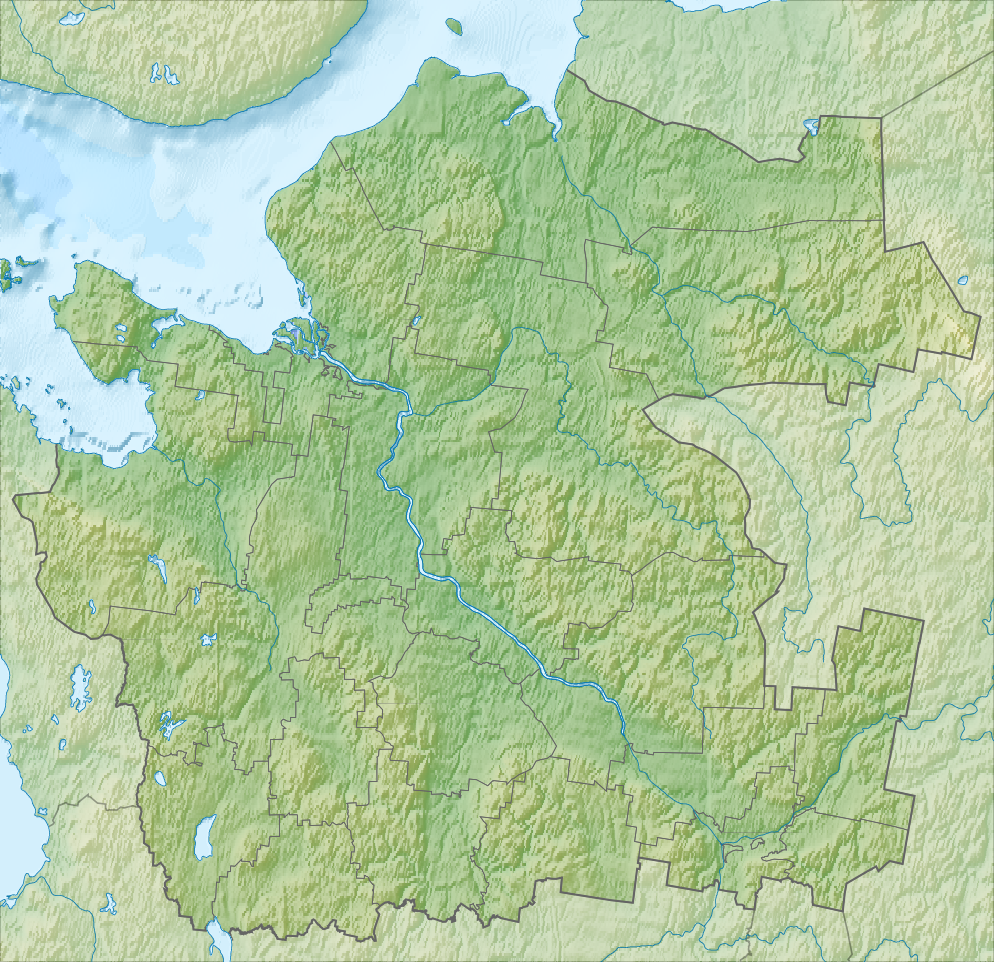
- Location within Arkhangelsk Oblast
- Location: Arkhangelsk Oblast
- Coordinates: 61°44′N 38°05′E
- Primary outflows: Lyokshma
- Catchment area: 197 square kilometres (76 mi^{2})
- Basin countries: Russia
- Surface area: 54.4 square kilometres (21.0 mi^{2})
- Surface elevation: 156 m (512 ft)

Lake Lyokshmozero (Russian: Лёкшмозеро) is a freshwater lake, located in the north-west of Kargopolsky District of Arkhangelsk Oblast in Russia. It is one of the biggest lakes in Arkhangelsk Oblast and the second biggest in Kargopolsky District (after Lake Lacha). The area of the lake is 54.4 square kilometres (21.0 mi^{2}), and the area of its basin is 197 square kilometres (76 mi^{2}). Lake Lyokshmozero is the source of Lyokshma, a tributary of Lake Lacha. The lake thus belongs to the Onega basin and the White Sea basin.

The lake is located close to the border of Arkhangelsk Oblast and Republic of Karelia. It belongs to Kenozersky National Park.

The lake has an oval shape, elongated in the northg-west - south-east direction. The Lekshma flows out of the south-eastern corner and flows south-east. There are four villages at the shores of the lake, Morshchikhinskaya, Kazarinovskaya, Ileksinskaya, and Khvalinskaya. The two latter villages are located on the unpaved road connecting Kargopol and Pudozh.

The lake has a glacial origin.
