= Saints Peter and Paul Church, Târgu Jiu =

Orthodox church in Târgu Jiu, Romania

Coordinates: 45°02′18″N 23°16′44″E

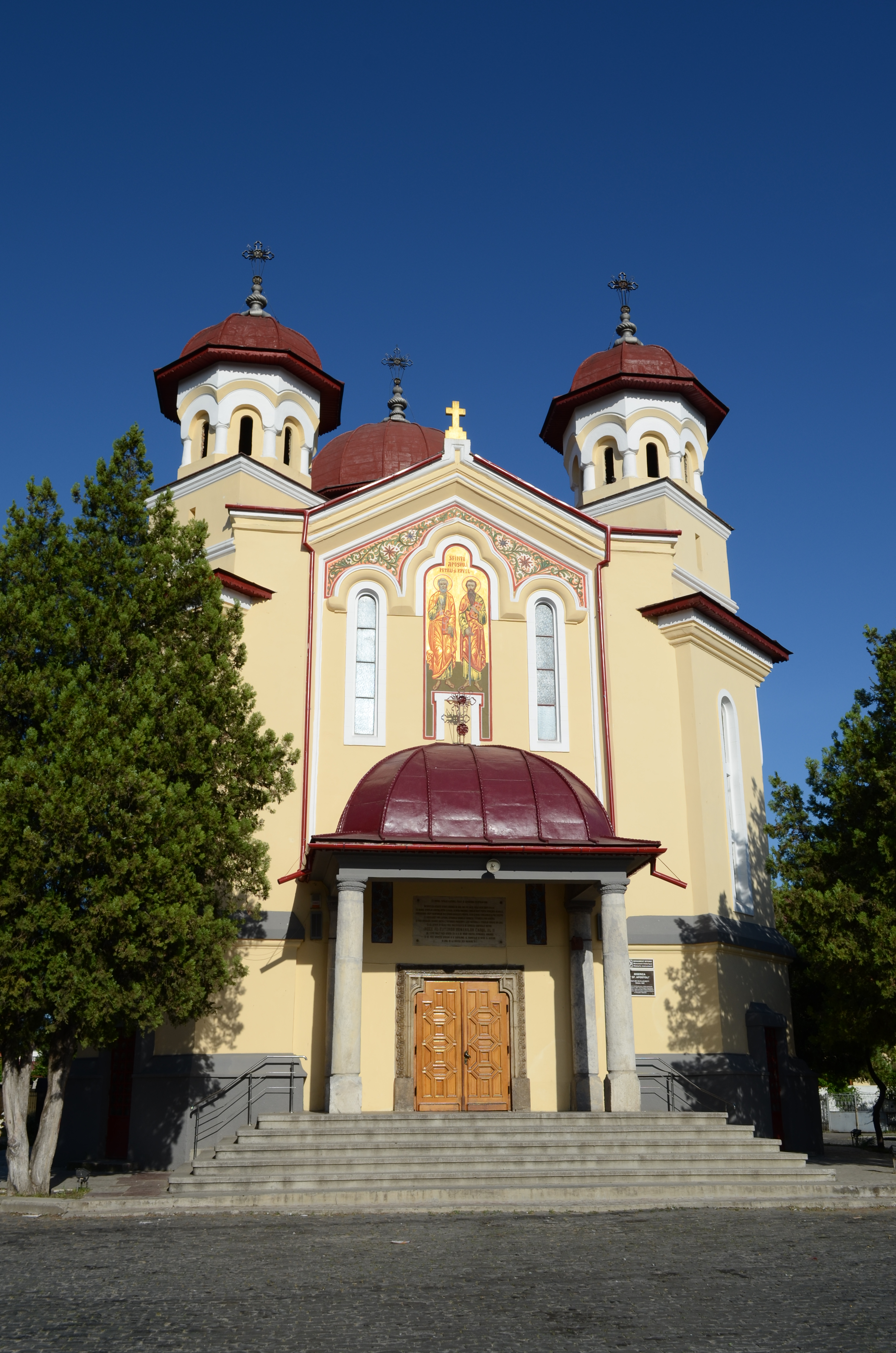
Saints Peter and Paul Church

Saints Peter and Paul Church (Romanian: Biserica Sfinții Petru și Pavel) is a Romanian Orthodox church in Târgu Jiu, Romania, located on Calea Eroilor.

The church is built along a road linking elements of the Sculptural Ensemble of Constantin Brâncuși, and is integrated with these works. It was built on the site of an earlier church from 1777. Erected between 1927 and 1938, it was dedicated at the same time as the sculptures, on November 7, 1937. Local painter Iosif Keber executed the neo-Byzantine frescoes, while Ion Antonescu, Anghel Păunescu and Julius Doppelreiter were the architects. The building is considered a historic monument by Romania's Culture Ministry.
