= Kenozero National Park =

National park in the north of Russia

Kenozersky National Park
- IUCN category II (national park)
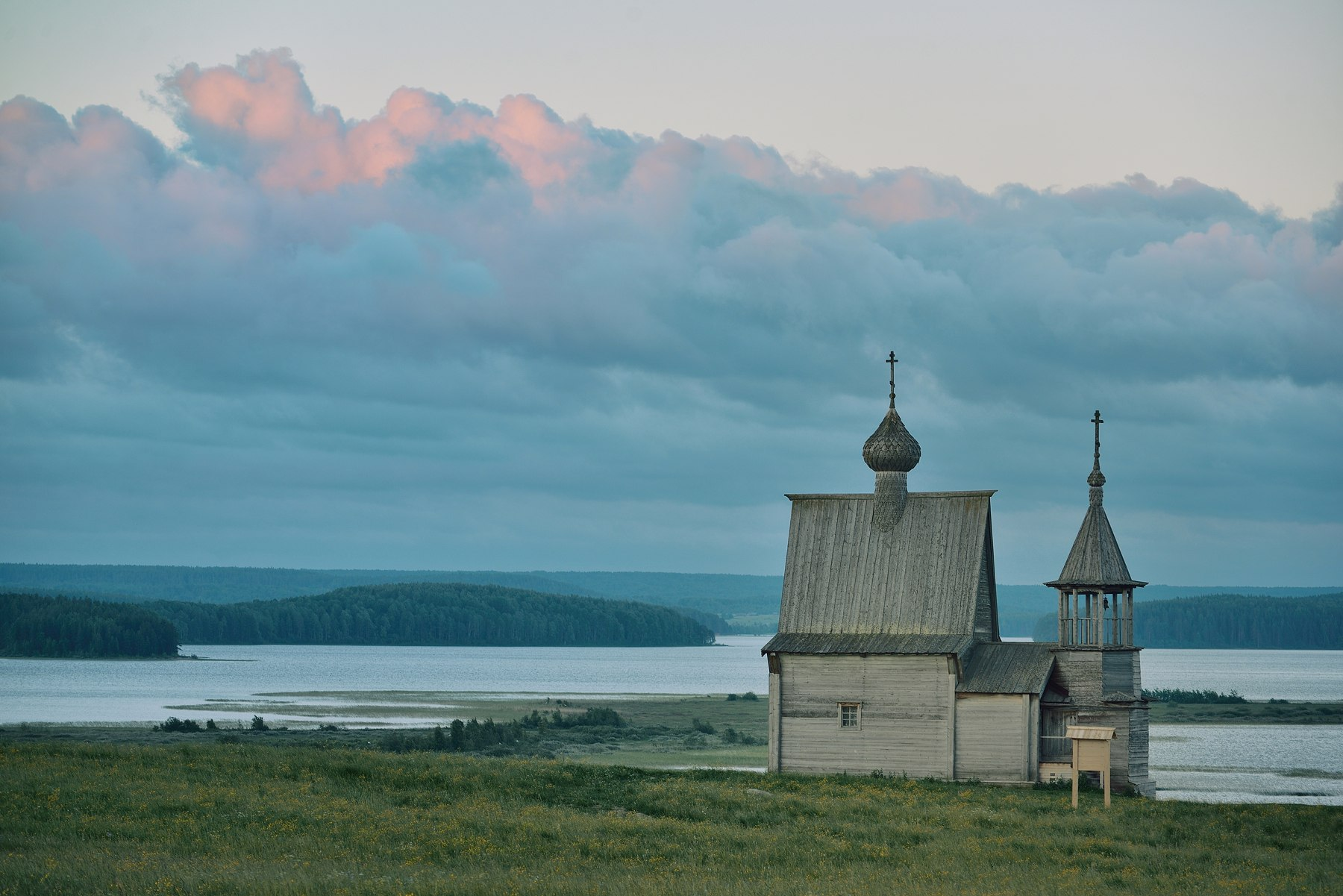
- A wooden chapel in Vershinino

- Location within Russia
- Location: Russia
- Nearest city: Kargopol
- Coordinates: 62°04′39″N 38°11′39″E
- Area: 1,396.63 square kilometres (539.24 mi^{2})
- Established: 1991
- Visitors: 8896 (in 2008)
- Governing body: Federal State Establishment "Kenozersky National Park"

UNESCO World Heritage Site
- Official name: Cultural Landscape of Kenozero Lake
- Criteria: iii
- Reference: 1688
- Inscription: 2024 (46th Session)

Kenozero National Park (Kenozersky National Park; Russian: Кенозерский национальный парк) is a national park in the Russian North. It is centered on Lake Kenozero and is located in Kargopolsky and Plesetsky Districts of Arkhangelsk Oblast.

The park was established at the behest of Yelena Shatkovskaya (its first and so far only director) on December 28, 1991. Since 2004, the national park has been a UNESCO Biosphere Reserve. Since 2024, its cultural landscape has been listed as a World Heritage Site. According to the World Heritage website:

The cultural landscape of Kenozero reflects the communal management of agriculture and nature that developed through the fusion and interaction of the Finno-Ugric forest culture and the Slavic field culture. Wooden churches and other religious buildings, originally decorated with painted ceilings, or “heavens”, are the key social, cultural, and visual landmarks of the area. Their spatial organization, together with sacred sites and symbols, highlight the residents’ spiritual connection with this environment.

Unlike most areas in the historical core of Russia, this cultural landscape has escaped industrialization / modernization during the Soviet period, preserving much of its original pre-Soviet aspect. The greatest threat to this landscape's integrity is the steady depopulation, as villages are increasingly abandoned.

== History ==
Kenozero has always been a remote area. In the 19th century, the area was divided between Pudozhsky Uyezd (west) and Kargopolsky Uyezd (east) of the Olonets Governorate. In Soviet Union, after a number of administrative changes, the area ended up in the Arkhangelsk Oblast. Since the end of World War II, the Russian North has suffered severely from depopulation: e.g., all villages between Lake Lyokshmozero and Lake Kenozero were deserted.

In 1991, the decision was taken to create a national park in the area. All historical monuments were transferred to the park administration, and some of them have been restored. December 28, 1991 the park was officially created. The staff of the park at the time of creation was 7 persons. In 1992 it was increased to 35 persons, and in 1993 to 153. In 2004, the park became a UNESCO Biosphere Reserve.

== Location and geography ==
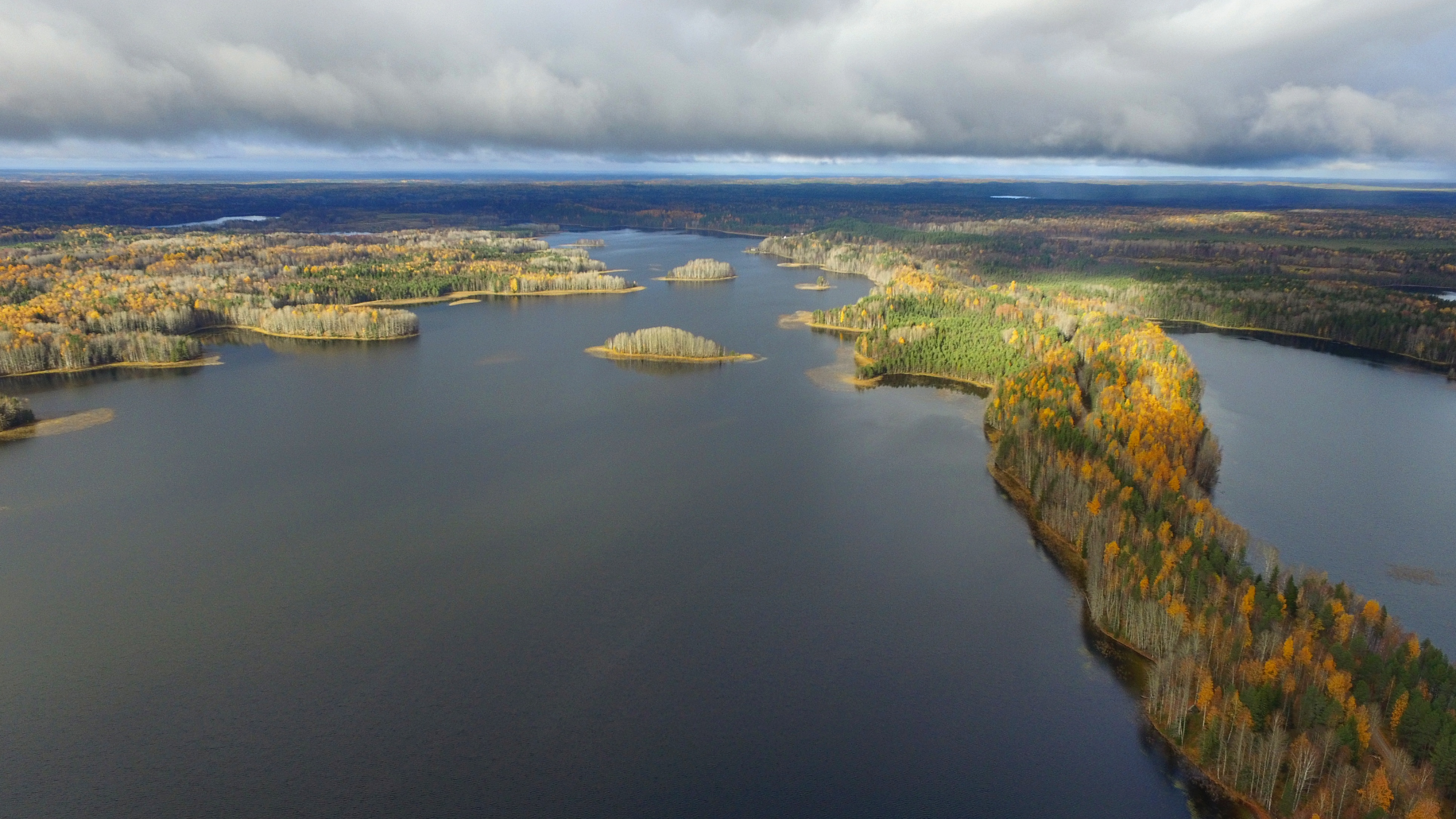
The park contains many bodies of water

Kenozersky National Park occupies the south-western part of Plesetsky District and the north-western part of Kargopolsky District of the Arkhangelsk Oblast, at the border with the Republic of Karelia. The northern part of the Park is centered at the Lake Kenozero, one of the biggest lakes of the region. The headquarters of the Park are located in the village of Vershinino, on the northern shore of the lake. The Lake Kenozero is the source of the Kena River, a major left tributary of the Onega. The upper course of the Kena is located in the park, as well as the Pocha River, the major tributary of the Lake Kenozero, its source, Lake Pochozero, and the lower course of the main tributary of the Lake Pochozero, the Undosha River.

The southern part contains Lake Lyokshmozero and the upper course of the Lyokshma River, a tributary of Lake Lacha. Lakes Lyokshmozero and Kenozero are separated by a number of lesser lakes, including Lake Naglimozero and Lake Vilno.

Some areas along the Karelian border drain into the basin of the Vodla, and eventually to the Baltic Sea. Thus, the park contains the portion of the divide between the basins of Atlantic and Arctic oceans.

== Tourism ==
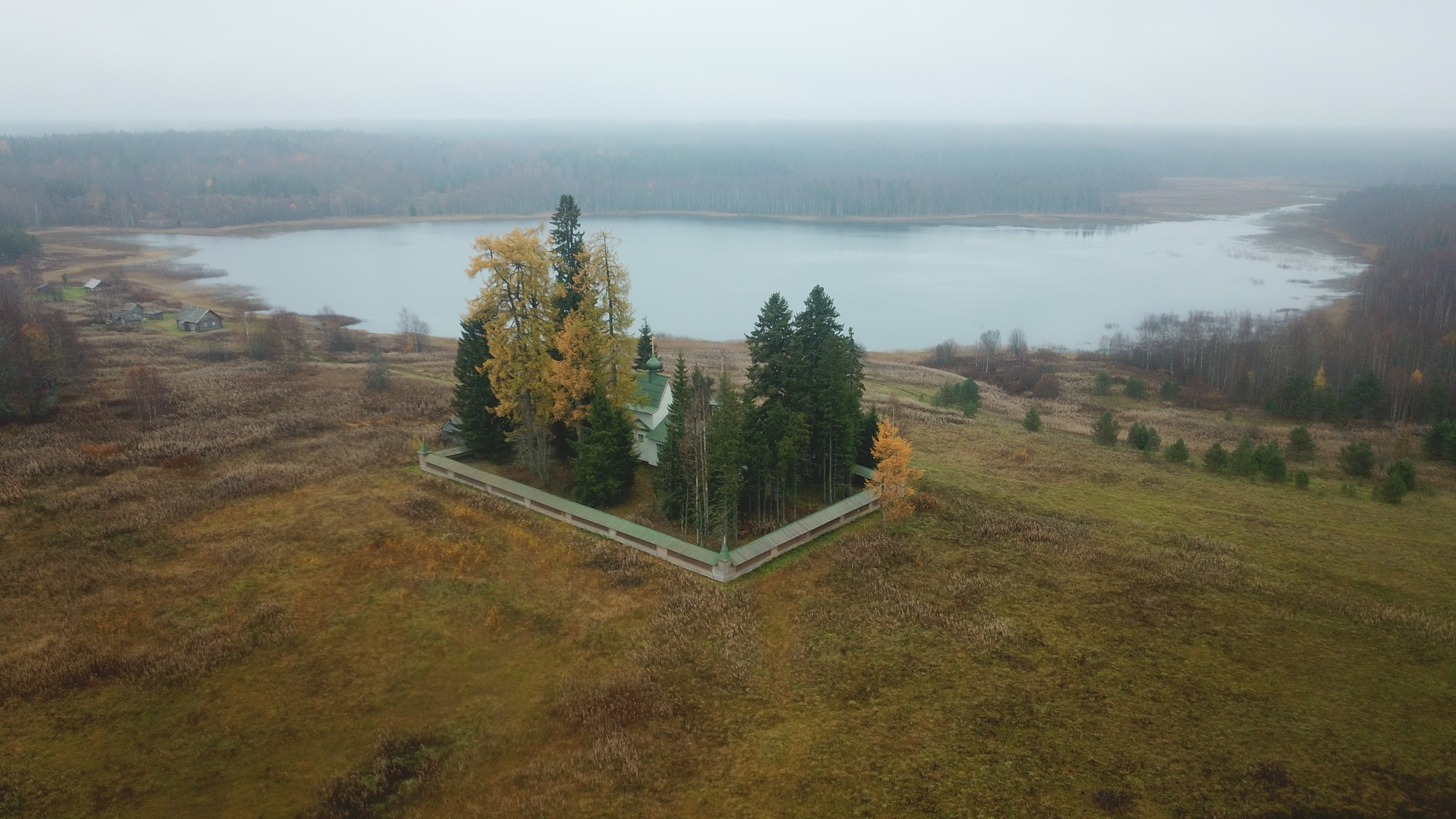
The Porzhensky Pogost

The remarkable array of historic wooden structures around Kenozero Lake, showcasing a wide variety of forms and functions, vividly reflects the cultural heritage of the region. Time-honored techniques of woodworking and log building illustrate the progression from simple log dwellings to intricate complexes of homes and sacred sites. The historical layout of rural settlements and traces of natural resource use within the picturesque lake-river setting further highlight the enduring cultural legacy of the Russian North.

An interesting example of Russian wooden architecture is the Porzhensky Pogost from the late 18th century, located in the western part of the park. It comprises St. George church with the bell-tower surrounded by the wooden wall with gates and towers. The villages adjacent to this ensemble of buildings have been deserted, and there is no road heading to it, so that the pogost is only accessible via a pedestrian trail.

The park is oriented at ecotourism. A number of trails have been opened in the park. There are two roads into the park. In the southern part, south of Lake Lyokshmozero, there is an unpaved road connecting Kargopol and Pudozh. Another road in the northern part of the park branches off from the Onega highway (Onezhsky Trakt), connecting Kargopol via Plesetsk to Yemetsk. This road runs to the village on Pershlakhta on Lake Kenozero and then connects to the other villages on and around Lake Kenozero.
