= Iram =

Iram or IRAM may refer to:

== Computing ==
- i-RAM, a solid-state drive based on volatile electronic memory (RAM)
- Berkeley IRAM project, research into intelligent random access memory
- Internal RAM, the memory range internal to a CPU

== Organisations ==
- Institut de radioastronomie millimétrique, operates two radio astronomical observatories
- Institut Reine Astrid Mons, a school in Belgium
- Instituto Argentino de Normalización y Certificación, an Argentine institute known as IRAM

== Other ==
- Erum (name), a Muslim name commonly spelt in English as Iram
- Iram Parveen Bilal, Pakistani-American filmmaker
- Iram Parveen Bilal, a character named after the filmmaker in the 2012 Indian film Agent Vinod, portrayed by Kareena Kapoor Khan
- Iram, a character in the 2025 Indian film Haq, portrayed by Paridhi Sharma
- Iram of the Pillars, a lost city located on the Arabian Peninsula
- Improvised rocket-assisted munition
- Information Risk Assessment Methodology, provides business-focused information risk assessment
