= Belfry of Mons =

Medieval bell tower and UNESCO World Heritage Site in Mons, Belgium

UNESCO World Heritage Site
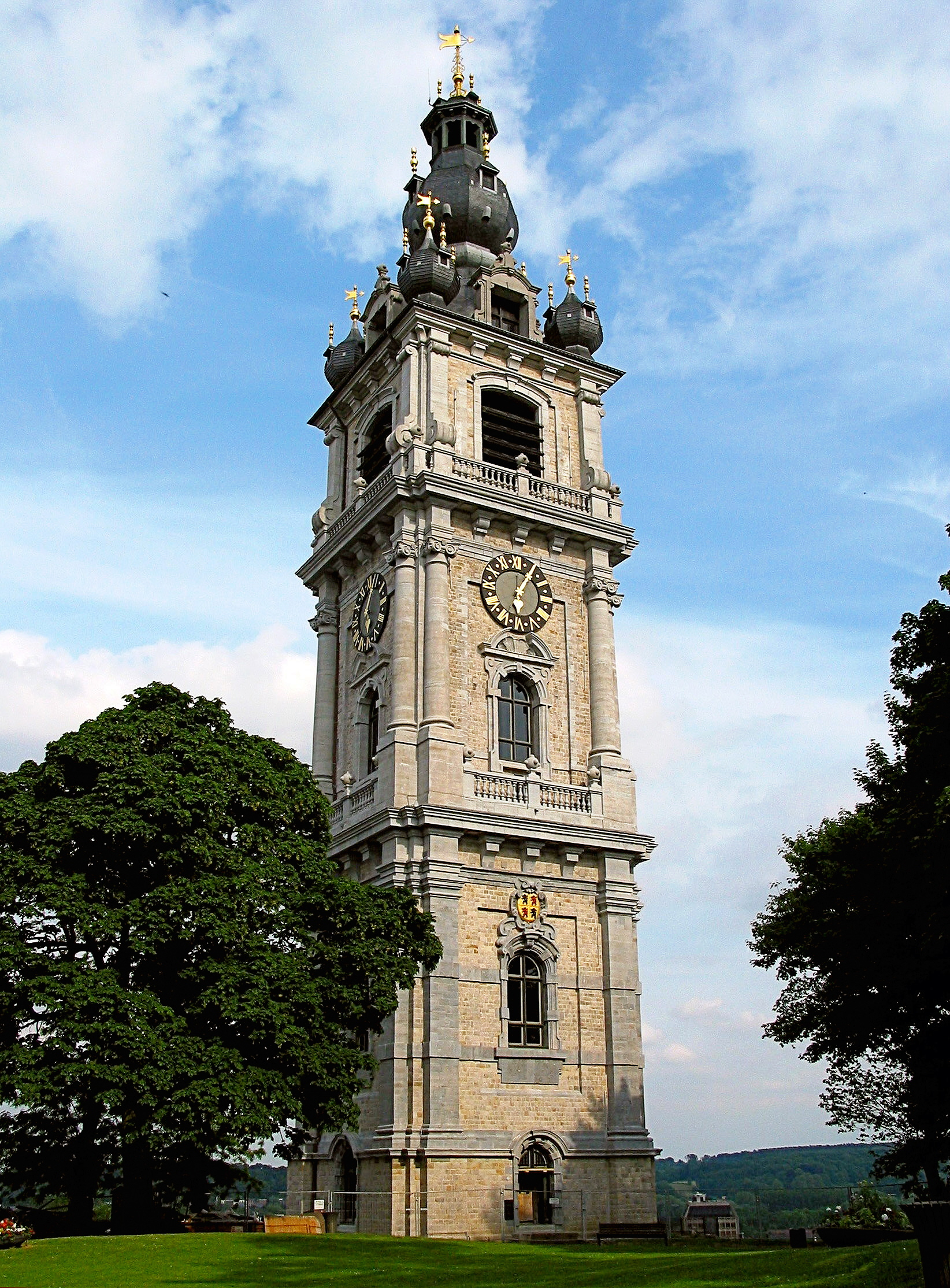
- Belfry of Mons

- Location within Belgium
- Location: Mons, Hainaut, Belgium
- Part of: Belfries of Belgium and France
- Criteria: Cultural: (ii), (iv)
- Reference: 943bis-008
- Inscription: 1999 (23rd Session)
- Extensions: 2005
- Area: 0.182 ha (0.45 acres)
- Buffer zone: 700 ha (1,700 acres)
- Coordinates: 50°27′15″N 3°57′00.4″E

The Belfry of Mons (French: Beffroi de Mons) is one of the more recent among the belfries of Belgium and France. At a height of 87 metres (285 ft), it dominates the city of Mons, Belgium, which is itself constructed on a hill. This belfry, classified in Belgium since 15 January 1936, belongs to the major cultural patrimony of Wallonia. It was inscribed on the UNESCO World Heritage List on 1 December 1999, for its unique architecture, civic importance, and testimony to the birth of municipal influence and power in the area. It is the only one in Belgium that is constructed in Baroque style.

== History ==
The building was designed in Baroque style by the architect Louis Ledoux. He led the works from 1662 until his death in 1667. The work was continued from 1667 to 1669 by Vincent Anthony. This belfry is both a prestigious construction and a functional building as it served to warn in case of fire or, during the Second World War, to give alerts against incoming bombardments.

== Characteristics ==
The Belfry of Mons does not have all possible belfry characteristics like the presence of a jail or rooms serving the Justice department, but Hainaut Province is not a region with belfries that are as typical as the ones in Belgian Flanders and in French Flanders. It houses a carillon with 49 bells.

From the top of the building, the battlefield of the Battle of Mons can be observed, as well as the Borinage, the plains of the Haine and the hills and hillocks at the side of it, the cement factories and the terrils of the old coal mines of the "Levant of Mons" in Bray (Binche).

== See also ==
- List of carillons in Belgium
- List of tallest structures built before the 20th century
