= Mons, Belgium =

Capital of Hainaut province, Wallonia, Belgium

Mons: Mont (Picard); Bergen (Dutch)
- City and municipality
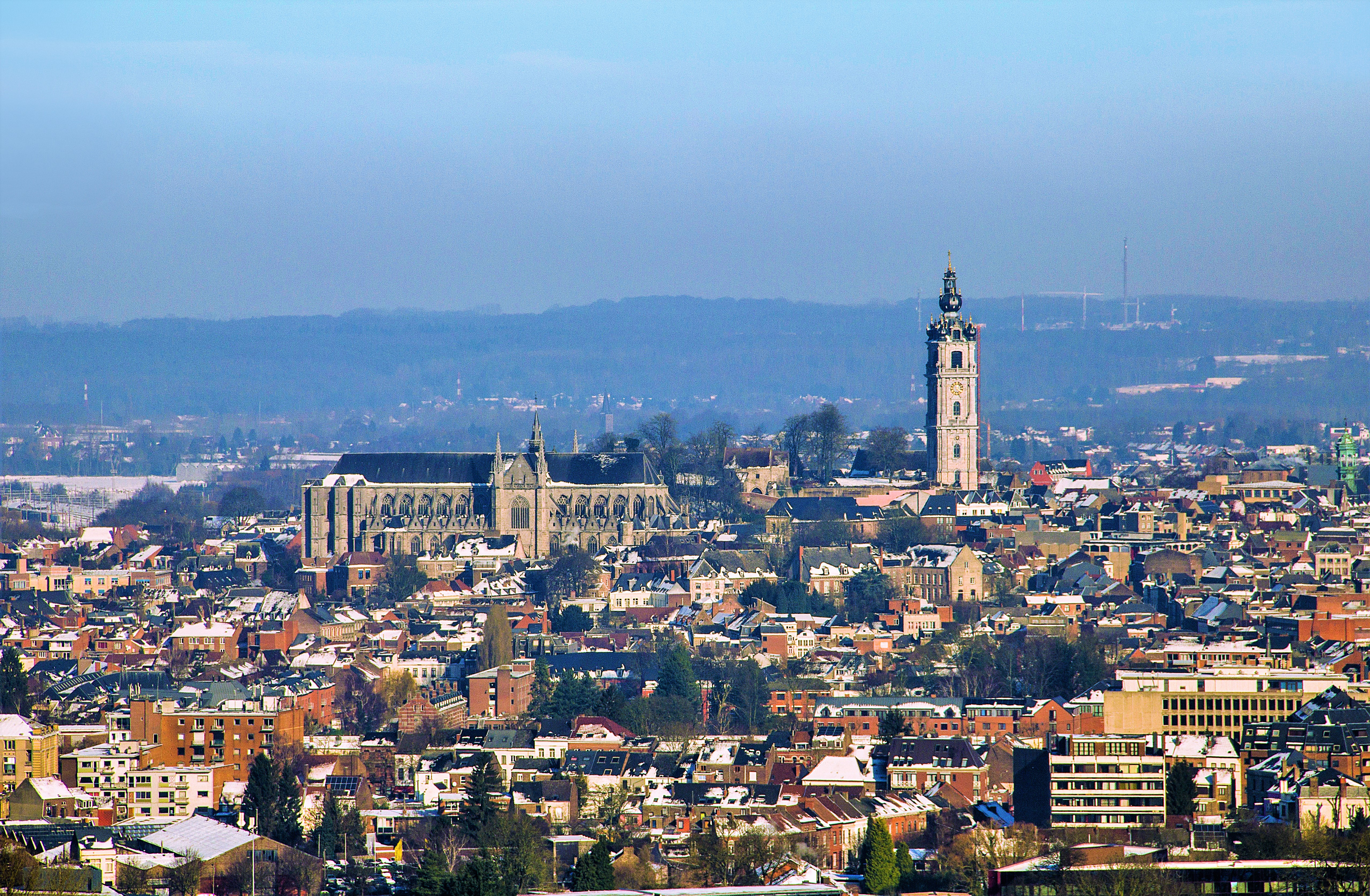
- Panorama of the old town

- Flag Coat of arms

- Location of Mons in Hainaut
- Interactive map of Mons
- Location in Belgium
- Coordinates: 50°27′17″N 3°57′09″E
- Country: Belgium
- Community: French Community
- Region: Wallonia
- Province: Hainaut
- Arrondissement: Mons

Government
  - Mayor: Nicolas Martin (PS)
  - Governing parties: PS, Ecolo, PTB

Area
  - Total: 147.56 km^{2} (56.97 sq mi)

Population (2018-01-01)
  - Total: 95,299
  - Density: 645.83/km^{2} (1,672.7/sq mi)
- Postal codes: 7000-7034
- NIS code: 53053
- Area codes: 065
- Website: www.mons.be

Mons (French: [mɔ̃s]; German and Dutch: Bergen, Dutch pronunciation: [ˈbɛrɣə(n)]; Walloon and Picard: Mont) is a city and municipality of Wallonia, and the capital of the province of Hainaut, Belgium.

Mons was made into a fortified city by Count Baldwin IV of Hainaut in the 12th century. The population grew quickly, trade flourished, and several commercial buildings were erected near the Grand-Place. In 1814, King William I of the Netherlands increased the fortifications, following the fall of the First French Empire. The Industrial Revolution and coal mining made Mons a centre of heavy industry. In 1830, Belgium gained its independence and the decision was made to dismantle the fortifications, allowing the creation of large boulevards and other urban projects. In 1914, Mons was the location of the Battle of Mons. The British were forced to retreat by a numerically superior German force and the town remained occupied by the Germans until its liberation by the Canadian Corps during the final days of the war. There are several memorial placards related to the World War I battles.

Today, the city is an important university town and commercial centre. The main square is the centre of the old city. It is paved in the manner of old cities and is home to many cafes and restaurants, as well as the Town Hall and Belfry. It is forbidden to park in or drive through the centre. Together with the Czech city of Plzeň, Mons was the European Capital of Culture in 2015.

== History ==
=== Early settlements ===
The first signs of activity in the region of Mons are found at Spiennes, where some of the best flint tools in Europe were found dating from the Neolithic period. When Julius Caesar arrived in the region in the 1st century BC, the region was settled by the Nervii, a Belgian tribe. A castrum was built in Roman (Belgica) times, giving the settlement its Latin name Castrilocus. The name was later changed into Montes for the mountain on which the castrum was built.

=== Middle Ages ===
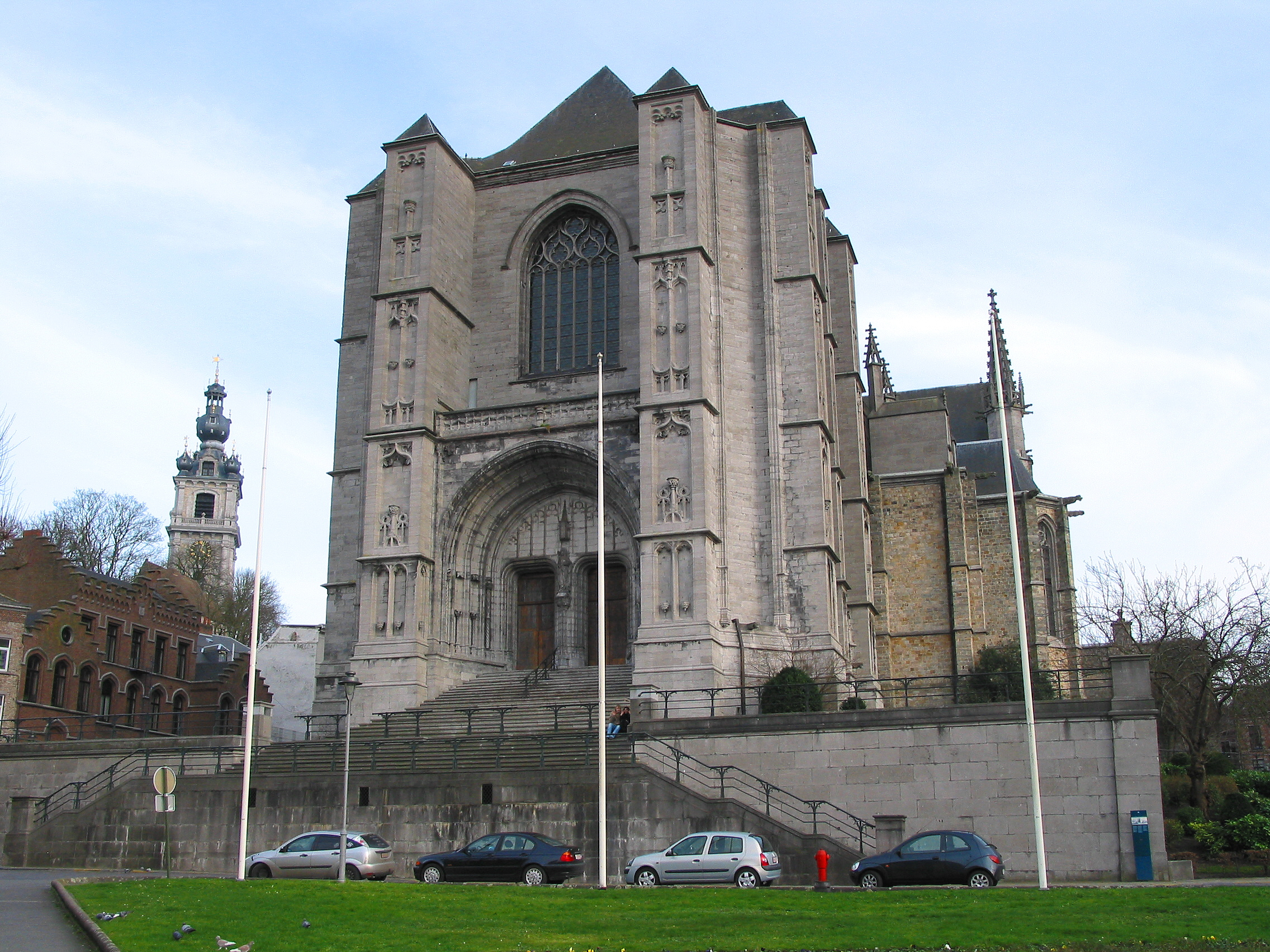
Saint Waltrude Collegiate Church and the Belfry of Mons

In the 7th century, Saint Ghislain and two of his disciples built an oratory or chapel dedicated to Saints Peter and Paul near the Mons hill, at a place called Ursidongus, now known as Saint-Ghislain. Soon after, Saint Waltrude (in French Sainte Waudru), daughter of one of Chlothar II's intendants, came to the oratory and was proclaimed a saint upon her death in 688. She was canonized in 1039.

Like Ath, its neighbour to the north-west, Mons was made a fortified city by Count Baldwin IV of Hainaut in the 12th century. The population grew quickly, trade flourished, and several commercial buildings were erected near the Grand-Place. The 12th century also saw the appearance of the first town halls. The city had 4,700 inhabitants by the end of the 13th century. Mons succeeded Valenciennes as the capital of the county of Hainaut in 1295 and grew to 8,900 inhabitants by the end of the 15th century. In the 1450s, Matheus de Layens took over the construction of the Saint Waltrude church from Jan Spijkens and restored the Town Hall.

=== From 1500 to 1800 ===
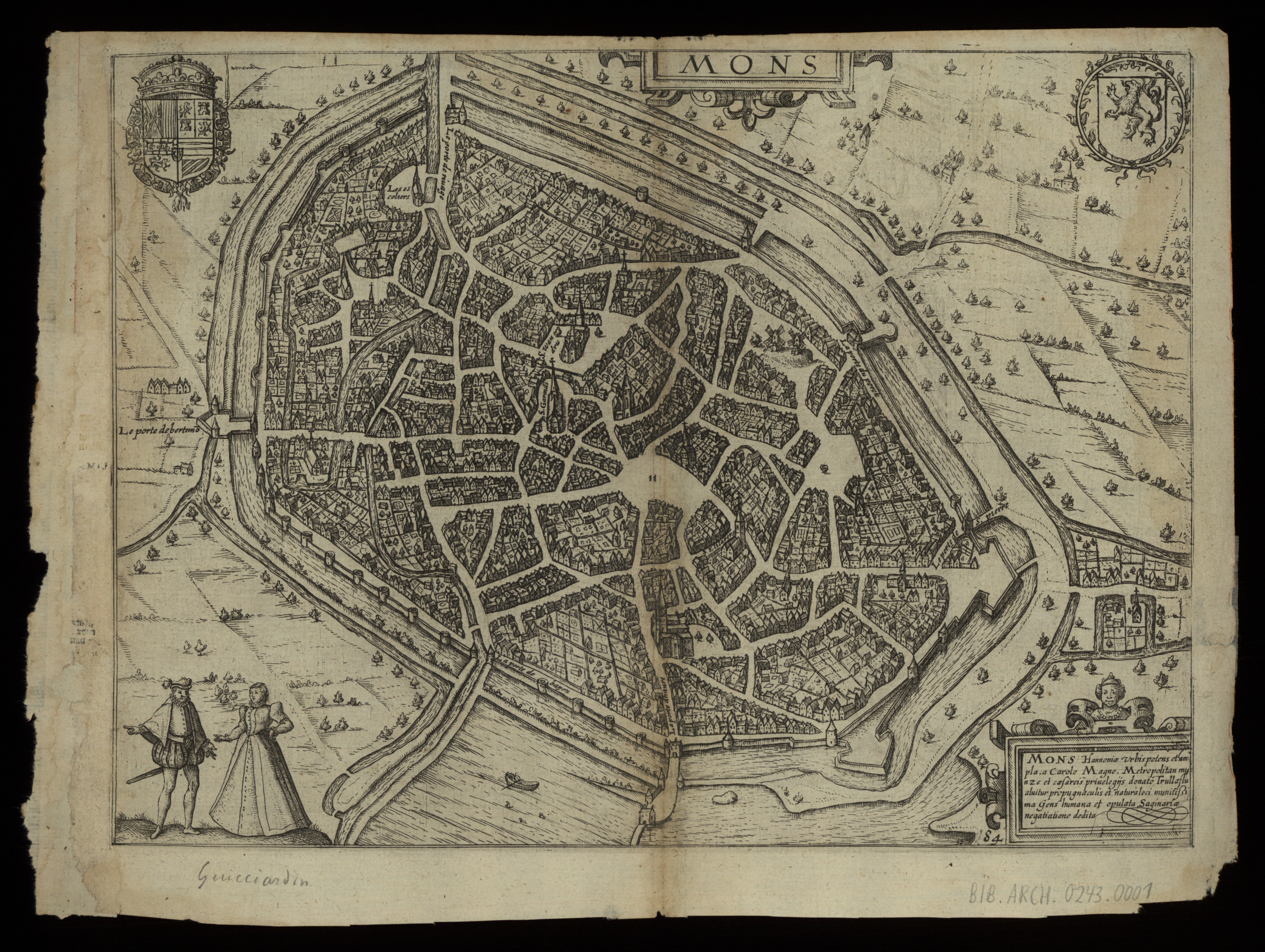
Map of Mons in the 16th century by Lodovico Guicciardini

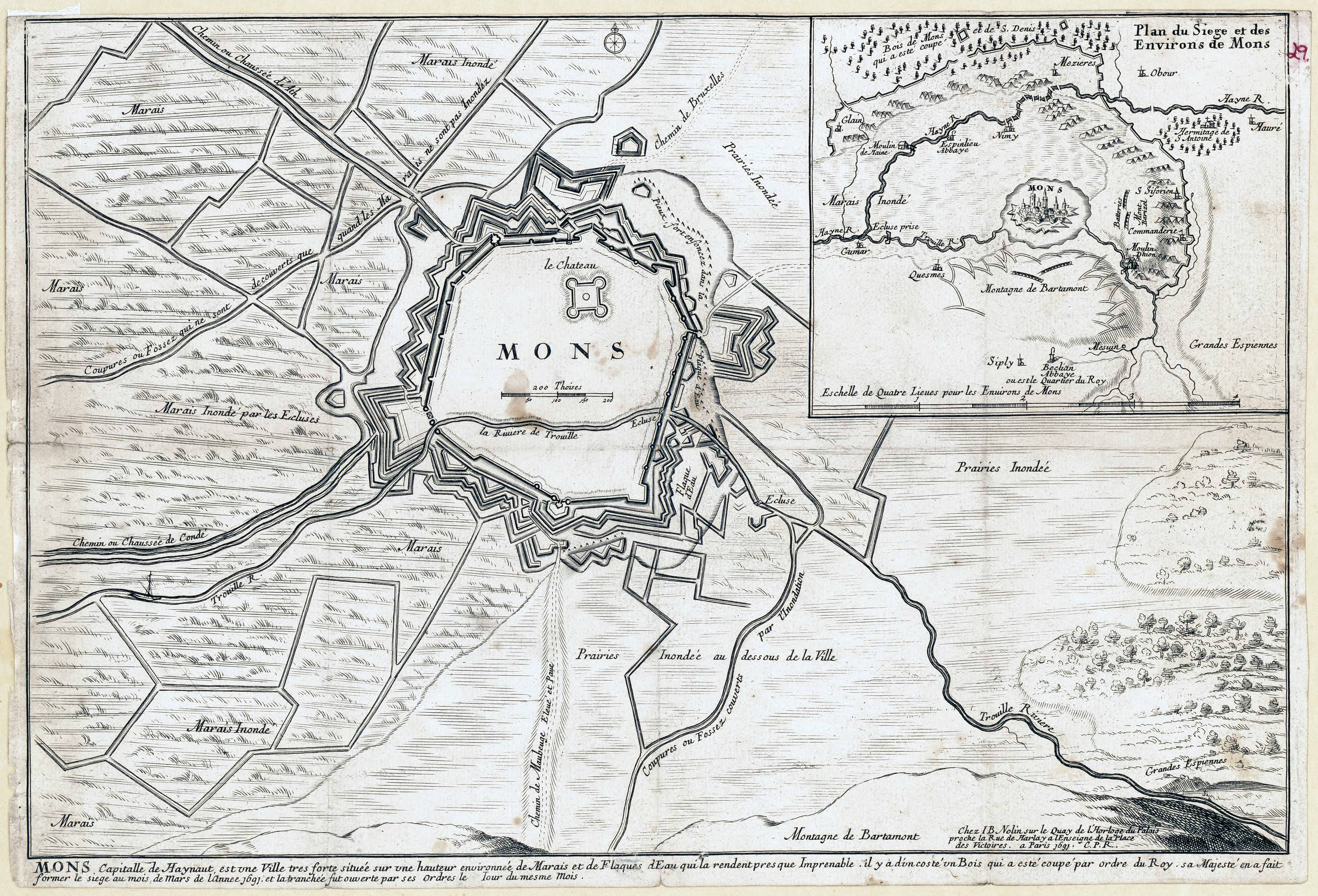
Map of Mons at the siege, 1691

In 1515, Charles V took an oath in Mons as Count of Hainaut. In this period of its history, the city became the target of various occupations, starting in May 1572 with the Protestant takeover by Louis of Nassau, who had hoped to clear the way for the French Protestant leader Gaspard de Coligny to oppose Spanish rule. After the murder of de Coligny during the St. Bartholomew's Day massacre, the Duke of Alba took control of Mons in September 1572 in the name of the Catholic King of Spain. This spelled the ruin of the city and the arrest of many of its inhabitants; from 1580 to 1584, Mons became the capital of the Southern Netherlands.

On 8 April 1691, after a nine-month siege, Louis XIV's army stormed the city, which again suffered heavy casualties. From 1697 to 1701, Mons was alternately French or Austrian. After being under French control from 1701 to 1709, the Dutch and British armies gained the upper hand in the Battle of Malplaquet and the Siege of Mons in 1709. In 1715, Mons returned to Austria under the terms of the Treaty of Utrecht (1713). But the French did not give up easily; Louis XV besieged the city again in 1746. After the Battle of Jemappes (1792), the Hainaut area was annexed to France and Mons became the capital of Jemappes.

=== From 1800 to the present ===
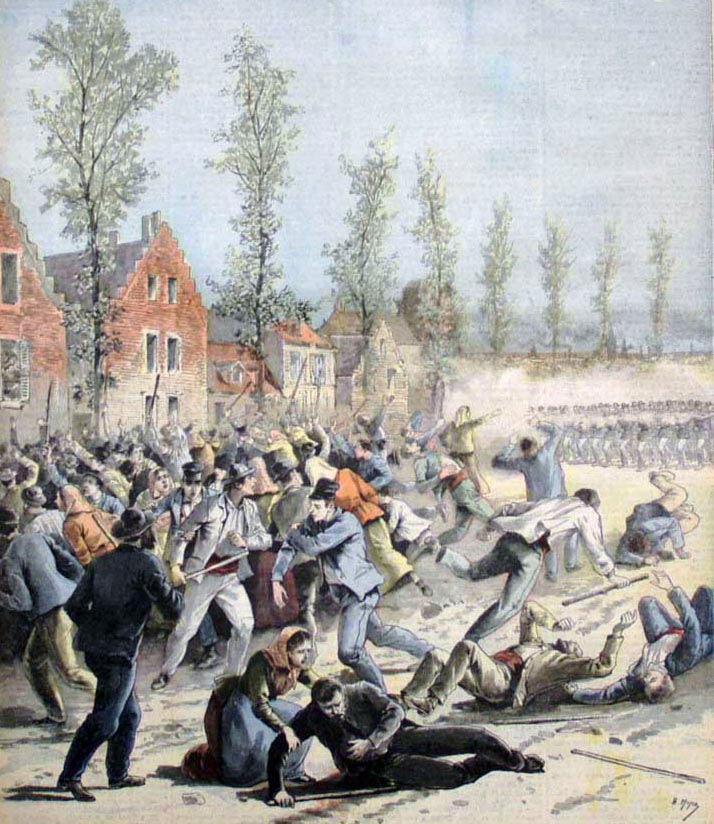
Troops of the paramilitary Garde Civique fire on strikers near Mons during the Belgian general strike of 1893 (Le Petit Journal, May 1893)

Following the fall of the First French Empire in 1814, King William I of the Netherlands fortified the city heavily. In 1830, however, Belgium gained its independence and the decision was made to dismantle fortified cities such as Mons, Charleroi, and Namur. The actual removal of fortifications only happened in the 1860s, allowing the creation of large boulevards and other urban projects. The Industrial Revolution and coal mining made Mons a center of heavy industry, which strongly influenced the culture and image of the Borinage region as a whole. It was to become an integral part of the sillon industriel, the industrial backbone of Wallonia.

==== Riots of Mons ====
On 17 April 1893, between Mons and Jemappes, seven strikers were killed by the civic guard at the end of the Belgian general strike of 1893. This general strike was one of the first general strikes in an industrial country. The proposed law on universal suffrage was approved the day after by the Belgian Parliament.

==== Battle of Mons ====
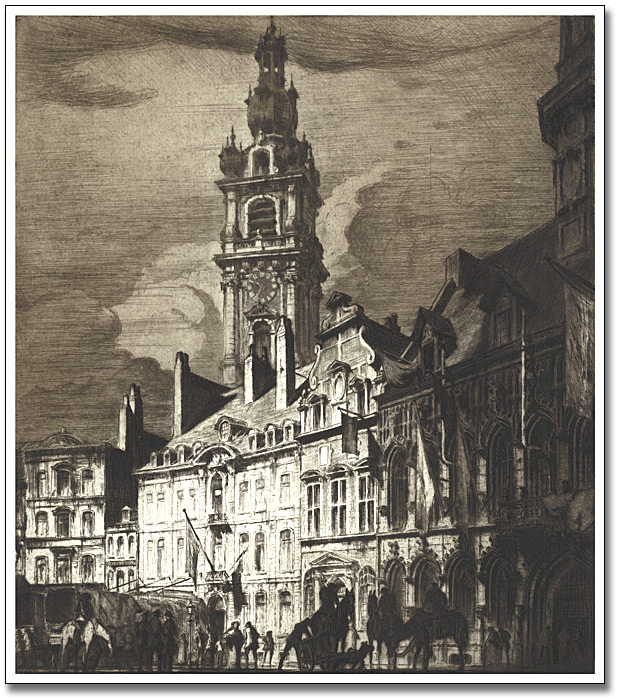
Canadians entering Mons in 1918

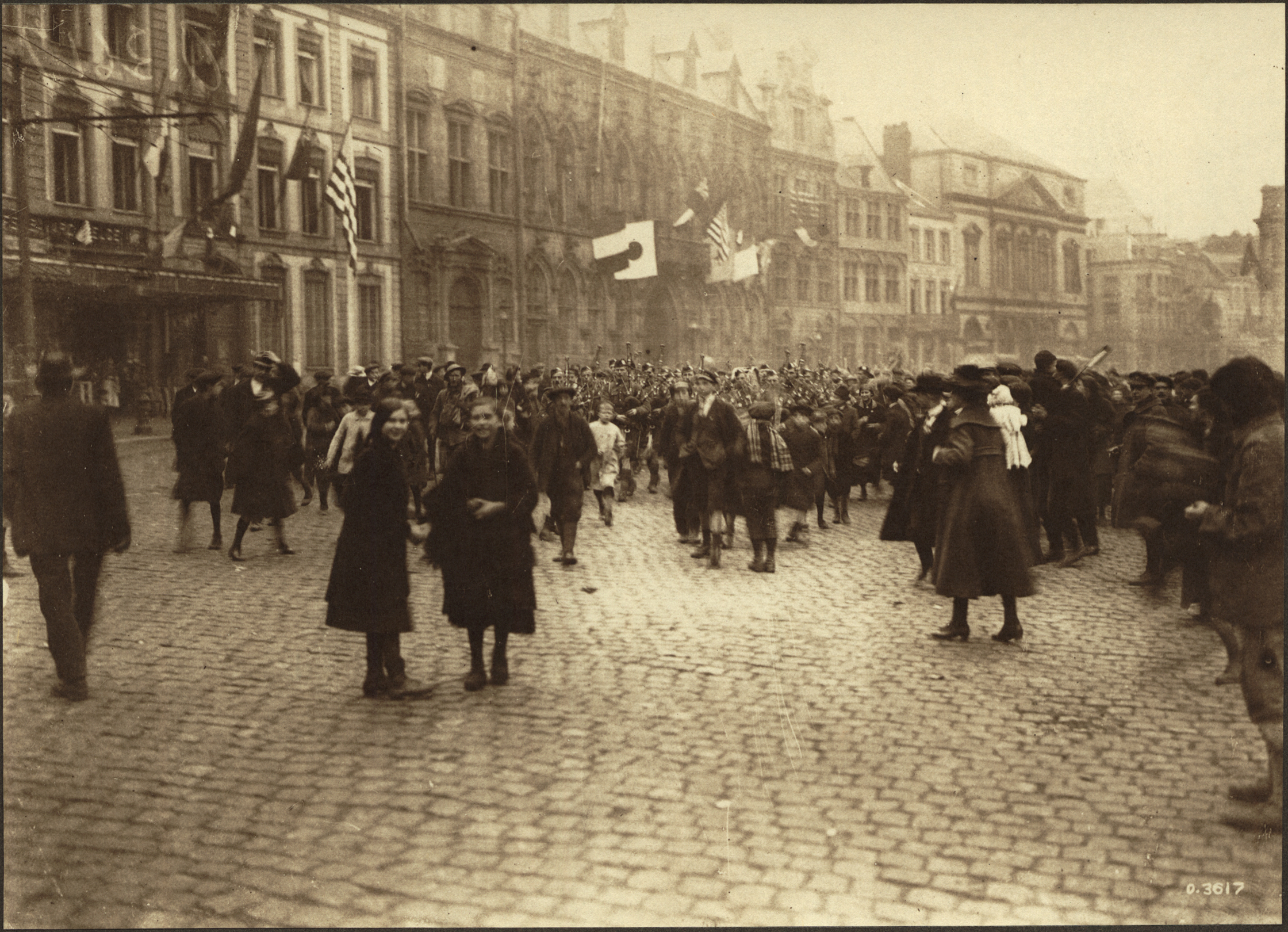
42nd Battalion marching through the Grand-Place, on the morning of 11 November 1918

On 23–24 August 1914, Mons was the location of the Battle of Mons—the first battle fought by the British Army in World War I. The British were forced to retreat with just over 1,600 casualties, and the town remained occupied by the Germans until its liberation in the Second Battle of Mons by the Canadian Corps during the final days of the war.

Within the front entrance to the City Hall, there are several memorial placards related to the First World War battles and in particular, one has the inscription:

MONS WAS RECAPTURED BY THE CANADIAN CORPS ON THE 11th NOVEMBER 1918: AFTER FIFTY MONTHS OF GERMAN OCCUPATION, FREEDOM WAS RESTORED TO THE CITY: HERE WAS FIRED THE LAST SHOT OF THE GREAT WAR.

==== Second World War ====
During the Second World War, as an important industrial centre, the city was heavily bombed. During the Battle of the Mons Pocket US Army forces encircled and took 25,000 Germans prisoner in early September 1944.

==== After 1945 ====
After the war, most industries went into decline.

NATO's Supreme Headquarters Allied Powers Europe (SHAPE) was relocated in Casteau, a village near Mons, from Rocquencourt on the outskirts of Paris after France's withdrawal from the military structure of the alliance in 1967. The relocation of SHAPE to this particular region of Belgium was largely a political decision, based in large part on the depressed economic conditions of the area at the time with the view to bolstering the economy of the region. A riot in the prison of Mons took place in April 2006 after prisoner complaints concerning living conditions and treatment; no deaths were reported as a result of the riot, but the event focused attention on prisons throughout Belgium. Today, the city is an important university town and commercial centre.

== Geography ==
The municipality consists of the following sub-municipalities: Ciply, Cuesmes, Flénu, Ghlin, Harmignies, Harveng, Havré, Hyon, Jemappes, Maisières, Mesvin, Mons proper, Nimy, Nouvelles, Obourg, Saint-Denis, Saint-Symphorien, Spiennes, and Villers-Saint-Ghislain.

== Demographics ==
Group of origin	Year		Year		Year		Year	
Group of origin	2000		2010		2020		2026	
Group of origin	Number	%	Number	%	Number	%	Number	%
Belgians with Belgian background	63,585	69,9	58,277	63,5	54,359	56,7	51,369	52.6
Belgians with foreign background	14,018	15,4	20,146	22	25,854	27	29,074	29,7
Neighbouring country	2,729	3,00	3,377	3,68	3,924	4,09	4,182	4,27
EU27 (excluding neighbouring country)	7,600	8,35	9,681	10,55	11,077	11,55	11,371	11,63
Outside EU 27	3,689	4,05	7,088	7,72	10,853	11,31	13,521	13,83
Non-Belgians	13,332	14.7	13,336	14,5	15,674	16,3	17,302	17,7
Neighbouring country	2,657	2,92	2,634	2,87	3,034	3,16	3,122	3,19
EU27 (excluding neighbouring country)	6,966	7,66	6,497	7,08	6,860	7,15	6,750	6,90
Outside EU 27	3,709	4,08	4,205	4,58	5,780	6,02	7,430	7,60
Total	90,935	100	91,759	100	95,887	100	97,745	100

== Festivities ==
- The Ducasse de Mons or Doudou is the name of a week-long series of festivities, which originates from the 14th century and takes place every year on Trinity Sunday. Highlights include:
  - The entrusting of the reliquary of Saint Waltrude to the mayor of the city on the eve of the procession.
  - The placement of the reliquary on the Car d'Or ("Golden Chariot"), before it is carried in the city streets in a colourful procession that counts more than a thousand costumed participants.
  - The lifting of the Car d'Or on a paved area near the Collegiate Church of St. Waudru; tradition holds that this operation must be successful for the city to prosper.
  - The Lumeçon fight, where Saint George confronts the dragon. The fight lasts for about half an hour, accompanied by the rhythmic Doudou music. The tradition of the processional dragon is listed among the Masterpieces of the Oral and Intangible Heritage of Humanity.

Tanks in town commemorates the liberation of Belgium during World War II by the American 3rd Armored Division, and is one of the world's largest gatherings of World War II tanks.

== Education ==
There are several public educational facilities in Mons:

- Conservatoire royal de Mons, CRM
- UCLouvain FUCaM Mons, a campus of the University of Louvain located in Mons since 1899.
- University of Mons, UMons, founded in 2009 by a merger between the Faculté polytechnique de Mons and the University of Mons-Hainaut.
- Institut Reine Astrid Mons
- Collège Saint-Stanislas, founded in 1851.

== Transportation ==
Mons is located along the N56 road. It is also accessed via European route E42, which is a continuation of French Autoroute A2, linking the British World War I battlefields of Mons with the Somme Battlefields,

Mons railway station opened on 19 December 1841.

A small, general aviation airfield Saint-Ghislain Airport is located nearby for private aircraft. The nearest passenger airports are Charleroi Airport, located 47 km (29 mi) east and Brussels Airport, located 84 km (52 mi) north east of Mons.

== Climate ==
Mons has a typical Belgian oceanic climate with relatively narrow temperature differences between seasons for its inland 50° latitude, as a result of Gulf Stream influence.

Climate data for Mons (1981–2010 normals, sunshine 1984–2013)
Month	Jan	Feb	Mar	Apr	May	Jun	Jul	Aug	Sep	Oct	Nov	Dec	Year
Mean daily maximum °C (°F)	5.8 (42.4)	6.7 (44.1)	10.5 (50.9)	14.2 (57.6)	18.3 (64.9)	21.0 (69.8)	23.5 (74.3)	23.2 (73.8)	19.4 (66.9)	15.0 (59.0)	9.7 (49.5)	6.2 (43.2)	14.4 (57.9)
Daily mean °C (°F)	3.2 (37.8)	3.5 (38.3)	6.5 (43.7)	9.2 (48.6)	13.2 (55.8)	16.0 (60.8)	18.2 (64.8)	17.8 (64.0)	14.7 (58.5)	11.0 (51.8)	6.7 (44.1)	3.8 (38.8)	10.3 (50.5)
Mean daily minimum °C (°F)	0.5 (32.9)	0.3 (32.5)	2.5 (36.5)	4.2 (39.6)	8.2 (46.8)	11.0 (51.8)	13.0 (55.4)	12.6 (54.7)	9.9 (49.8)	7.0 (44.6)	3.7 (38.7)	1.4 (34.5)	6.2 (43.2)
Average precipitation mm (inches)	71.2 (2.80)	58.6 (2.31)	69.0 (2.72)	49.2 (1.94)	67.2 (2.65)	74.9 (2.95)	70.1 (2.76)	73.7 (2.90)	61.0 (2.40)	73.2 (2.88)	72.9 (2.87)	76.5 (3.01)	817.6 (32.19)
Average precipitation days	12.8	10.8	12.6	10.1	11.5	10.9	10.5	10.3	10.5	11.2	12.9	12.8	137.0
Mean monthly sunshine hours	55	75	121	173	203	197	216	205	148	118	65	46	1,621
Source: Royal Meteorological Institute

== Sports ==
The town hosts a professional basketball team called Belfius Mons-Hainaut and a tennis tournament called the Ethias Trophy. It previously hosted the football club R.A.E.C. Mons, though the team has since disbanded. There is also a horse racing venue at Hippodrome de Wallonie in Mons.

== Planning and architectural heritage ==
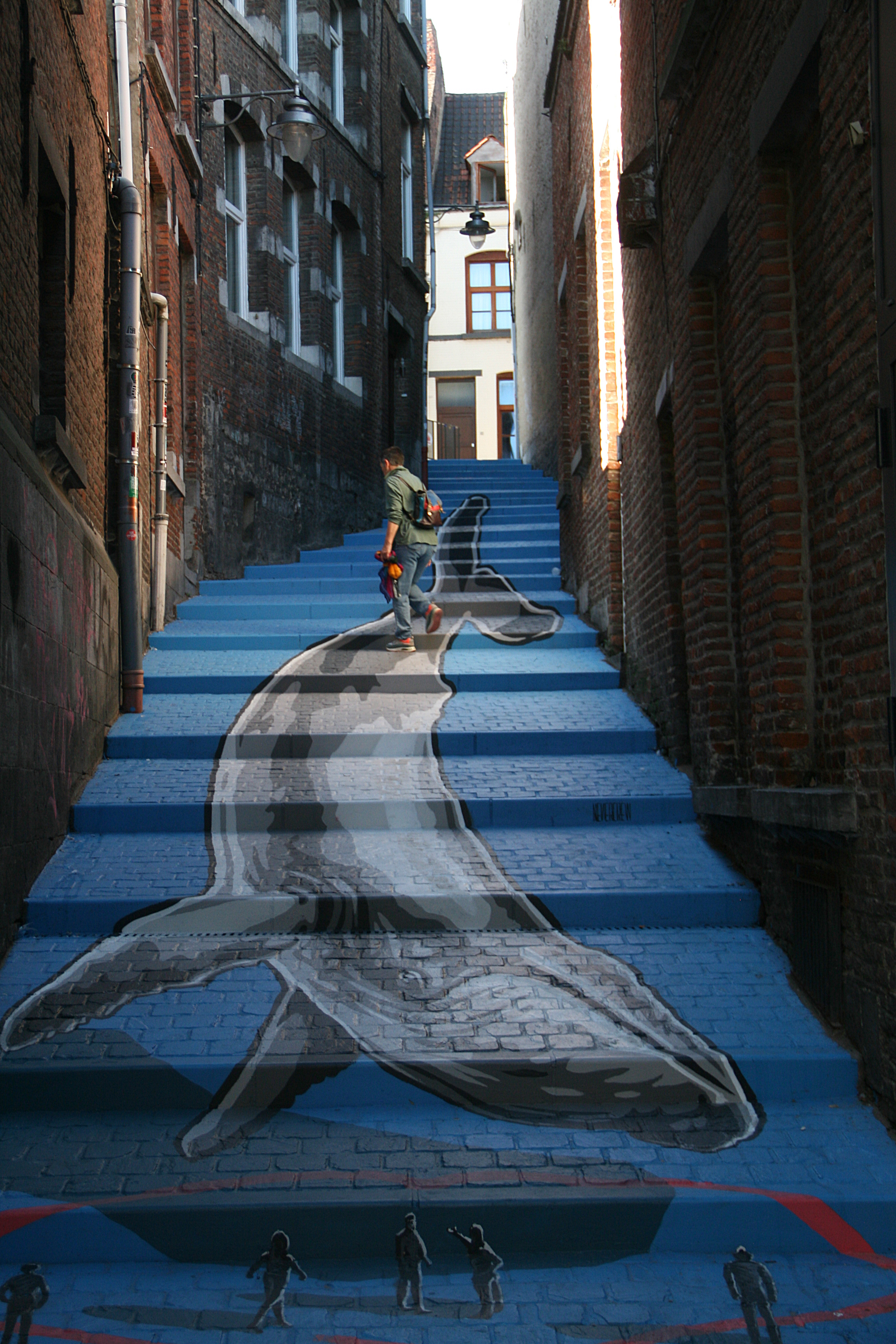
Typical narrow street decorated with a "street art" design

The centre consists largely of red brick houses. Although there are few old buildings and rarely new blue stone buildings, its use is generally limited to parts of the decorative walls. Much of the centre is made up of houses which are two or three storeys high. In commercial areas, the ground floor is used as commercial space, while other floors are used for housing. Generally behind the houses there is a small garden.

The outskirts of the city are also generally made of brick terraced houses. They nevertheless have the largest green spaces in the front or rear. In more remote areas of the centre, there are four façades of the villas.

After the Second World War the city experienced rather limited construction of buildings. Some public housing have been built in Ghlin, Hyon Jemappes and in the suburbs of the city. Since the late 1990s and especially since the arson which took place in one of these buildings, the city undertook a policy of deconstruction of these houses which is still in progress at the moment. A whole series of social buildings are evenly dispersed in the downtown and surrounding suburbs.

16,5% of the city's population lives in apartments (17% in Belgium) and 82.7% in single-family homes (82.3% in Belgium). Of the 82.7% who live in single family homes, only 26% (37.3% in Belgium) are separate houses, while 55.7% (44.4 in Belgium) are detached or terraced houses. That's pretty much a small town in Belgium. Large municipalities have in fact fewer single family homes, but many more apartments whereas the smallest towns have few apartments and a lot of single family homes. The figures show very clearly the strong presence of terraced houses rather than separate houses: it exemplifies the urbanization of downtown, but also urban cores such as Jemappes et Cuesmes.

=== Grand-Place ===
The Grand-Place is the centre of the old city. It is situated near the shopping street (pedestrian) and the Belfry. It is paved in the manner of old cities and is home to many cafes and restaurants, as well as the Town Hall. The outskirts of the square are accessible by car, but it is forbidden to park or drive through the centre. Each year, the square is used as an action theatre called Lumeçon to stage a battle between Saint George and Dragon. The Grand-Place is also equipped with a fountain, which opened on 21 March 2006. It also hosts a Christmas market and sometimes an ice rink during the winter holiday period.

The façade of the building called "au Blan Levrie" shows the care with which the city attempted to unite the old and the modern. It is the first authorised building in the main square which was made of stone to avoid fire incidents. It was originally built in 1530 in the Gothic style, for the Malaperts, a wealthy local family. In 1975, the architects A. Godart and O. Dupire were assigned to design a bank. They proceeded to gut the interior and conduct a precise survey of the whole before beginning the restoration project. The façade was completely restored, sometimes (as below) by extending the design of mouldings, but the fenestration proved impossible to restore as there were not enough clues from the remains of the original to do so. Therefore, "The choice was directed towards a contemporary discrete [style], appearing in second test [?]: they are steel frame whose profiles are thinner. » Impression yet reinforced by the way of which was treated at the entrance gate.[?]"

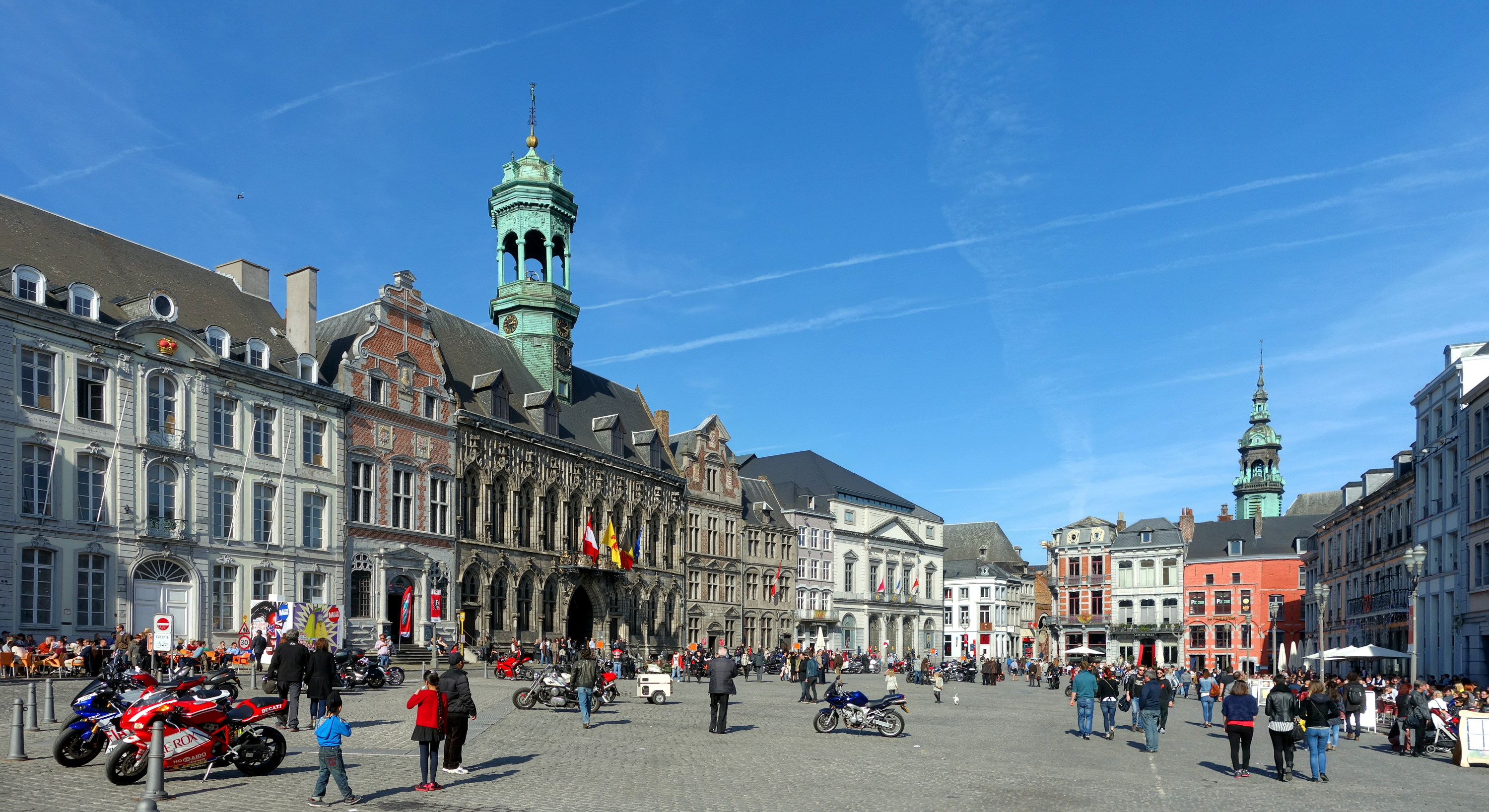
The Grand-Place and Town Hall of Mons

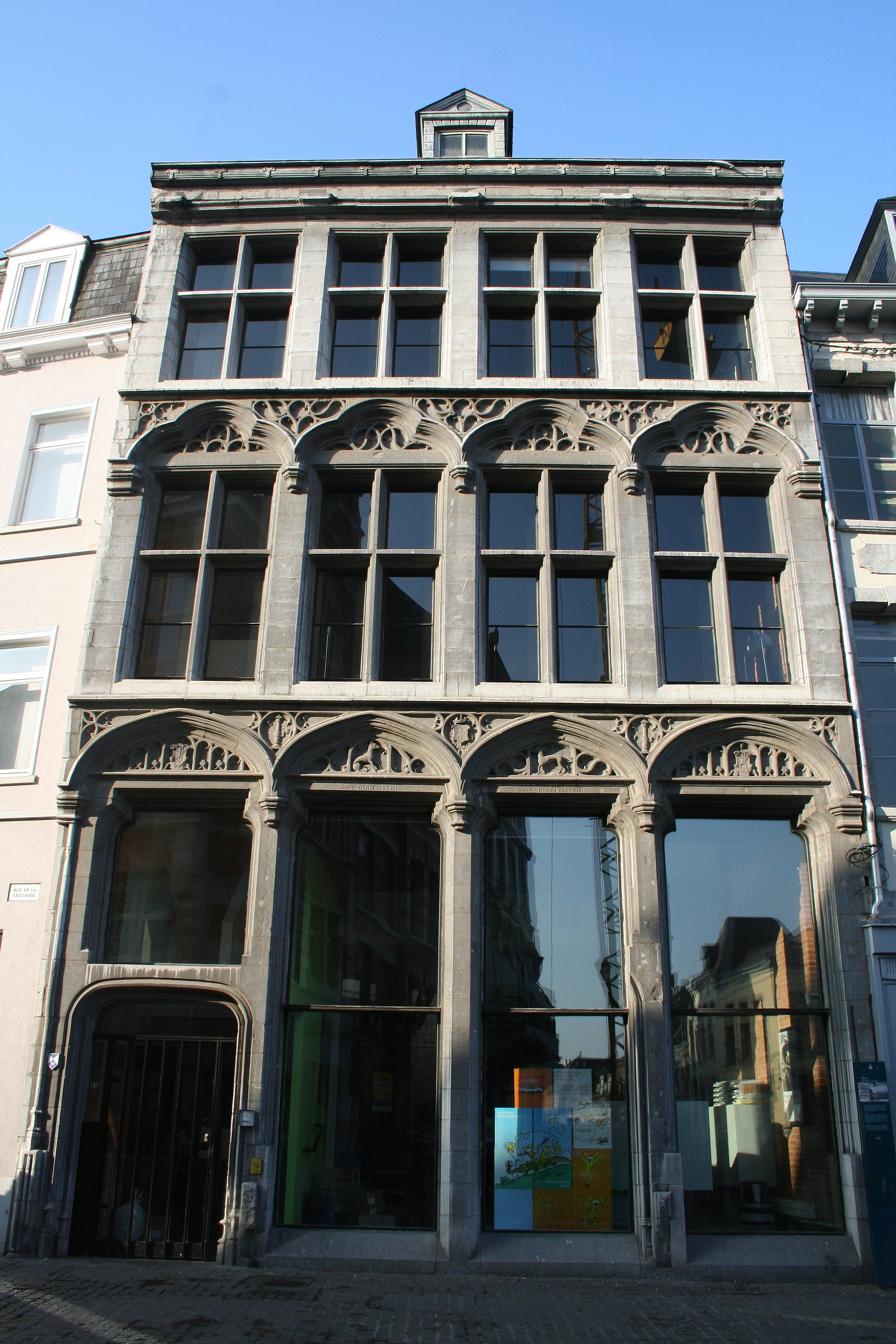
The house called Blan Levrie

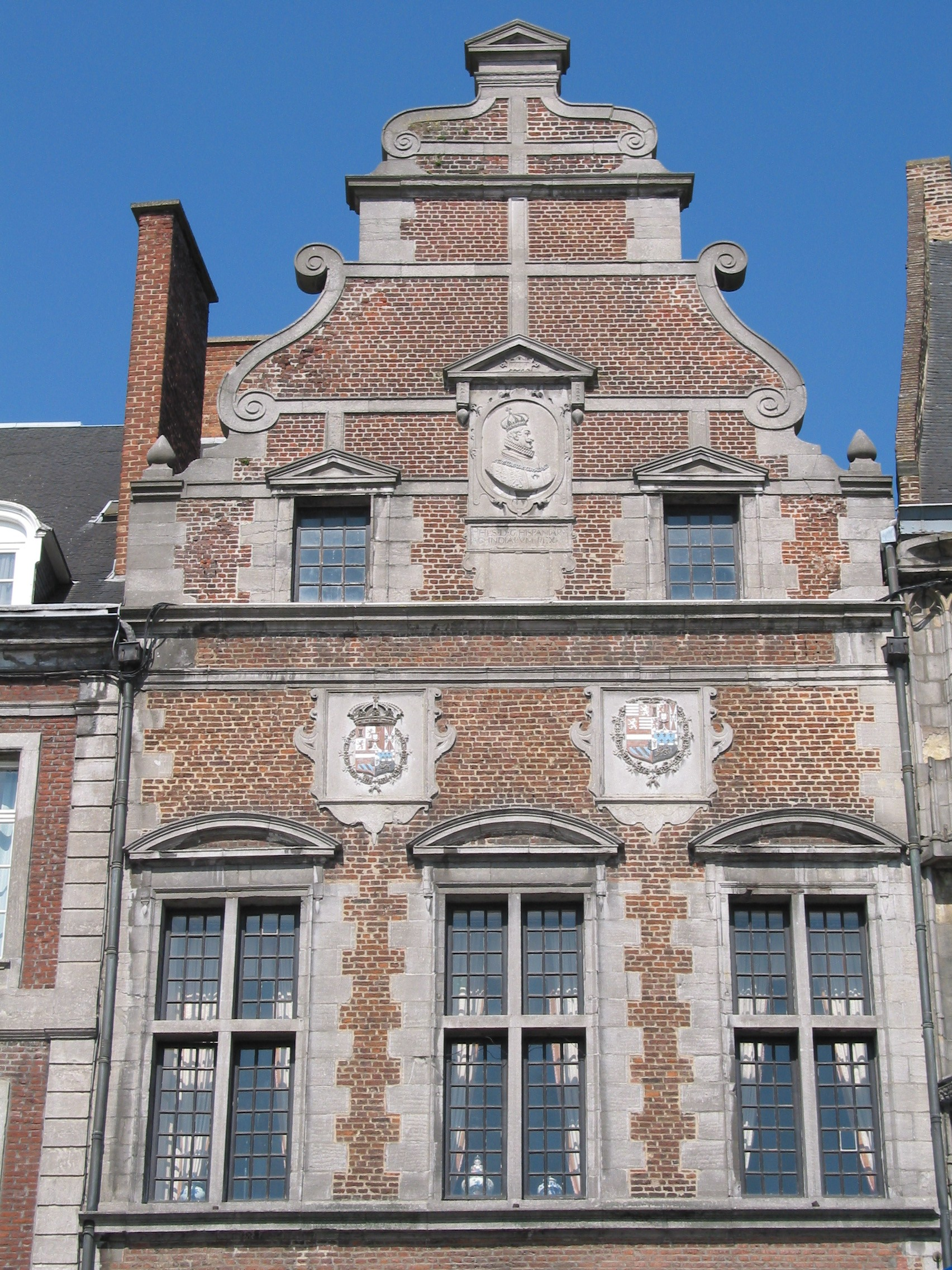
The former St. George's Chapel

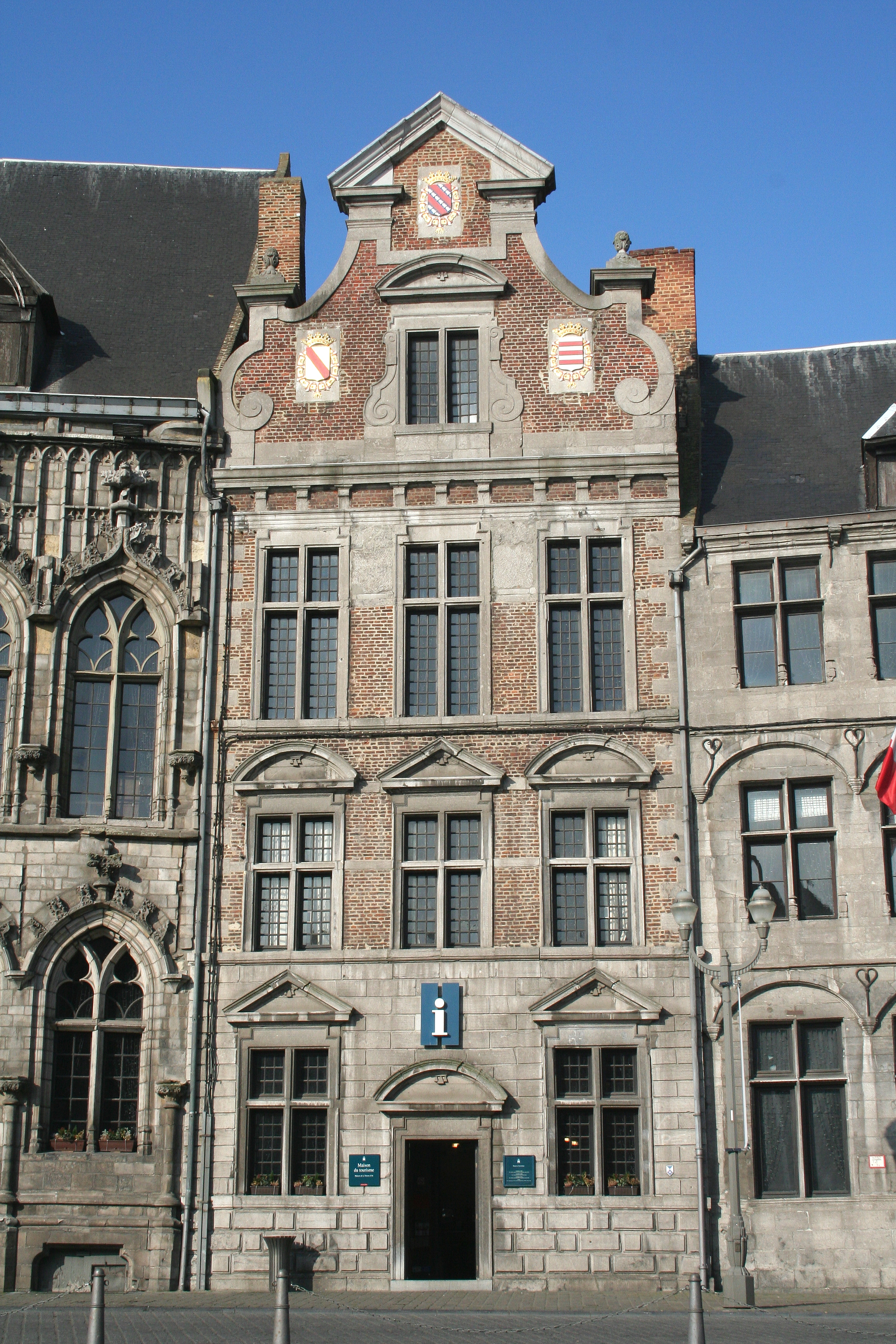
The house called de la Toison d'Or

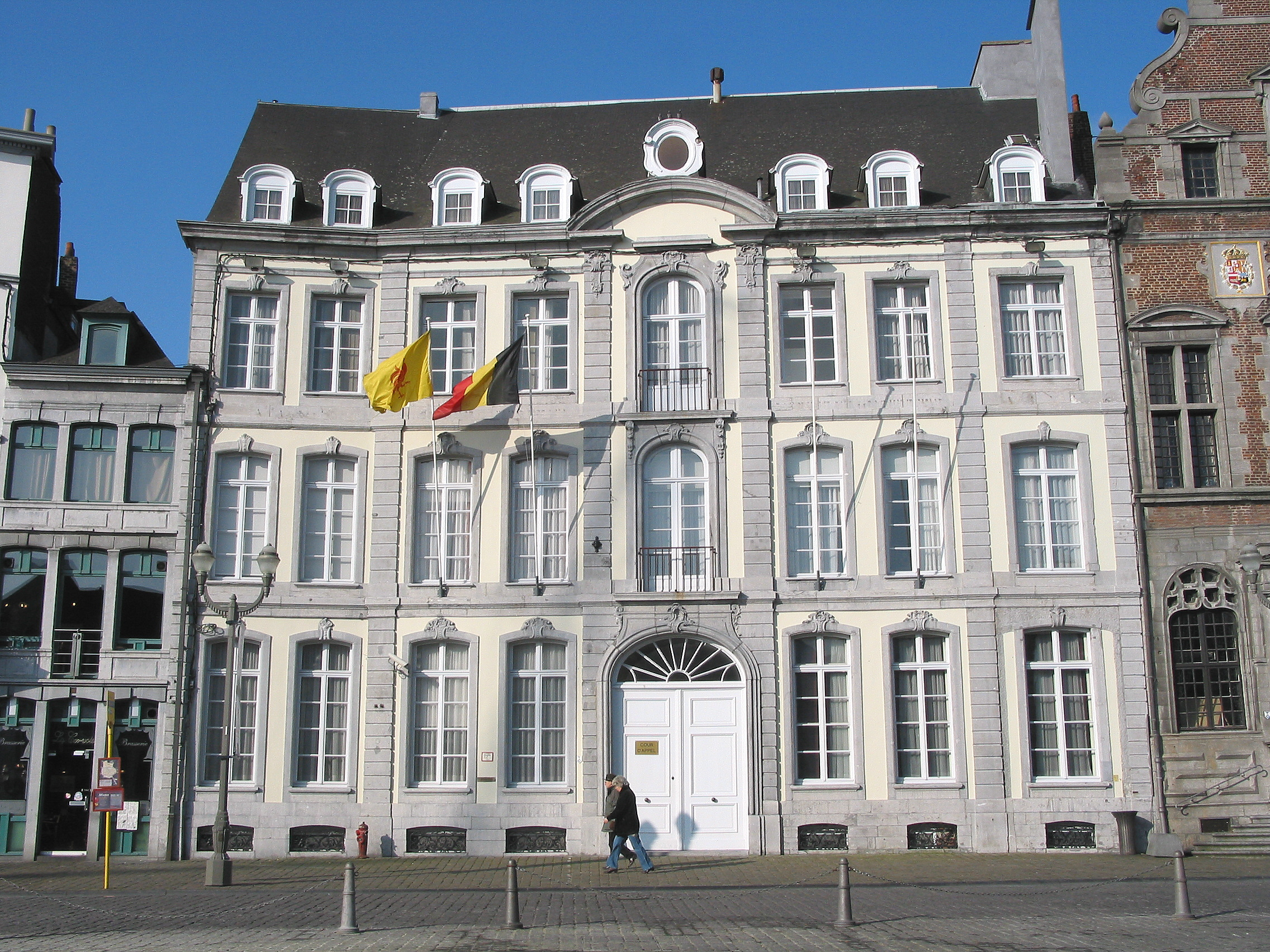
The old hotel in the circle

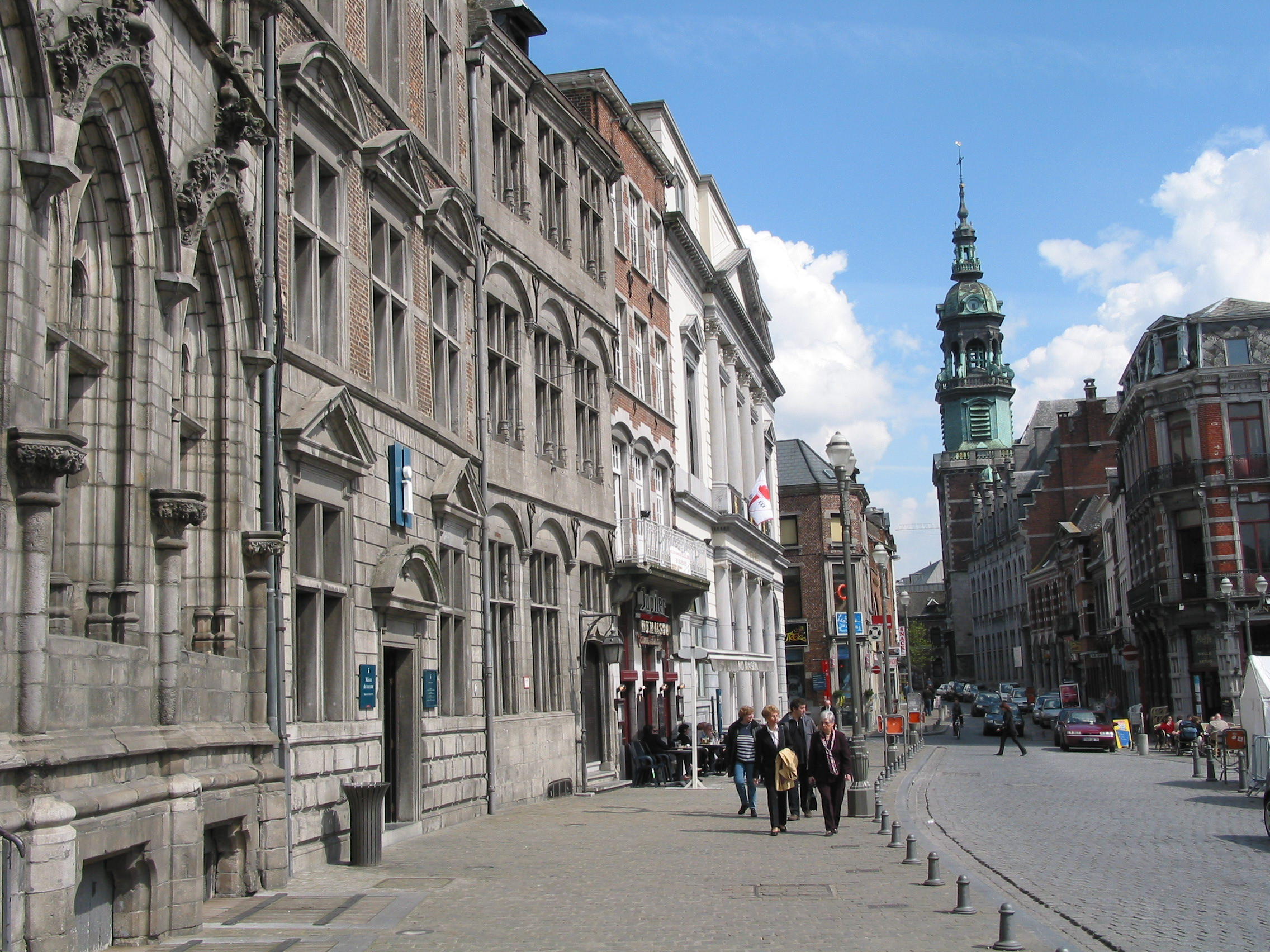
View of the beginning of the Rue Nimy and the Church of St. Elizabeth

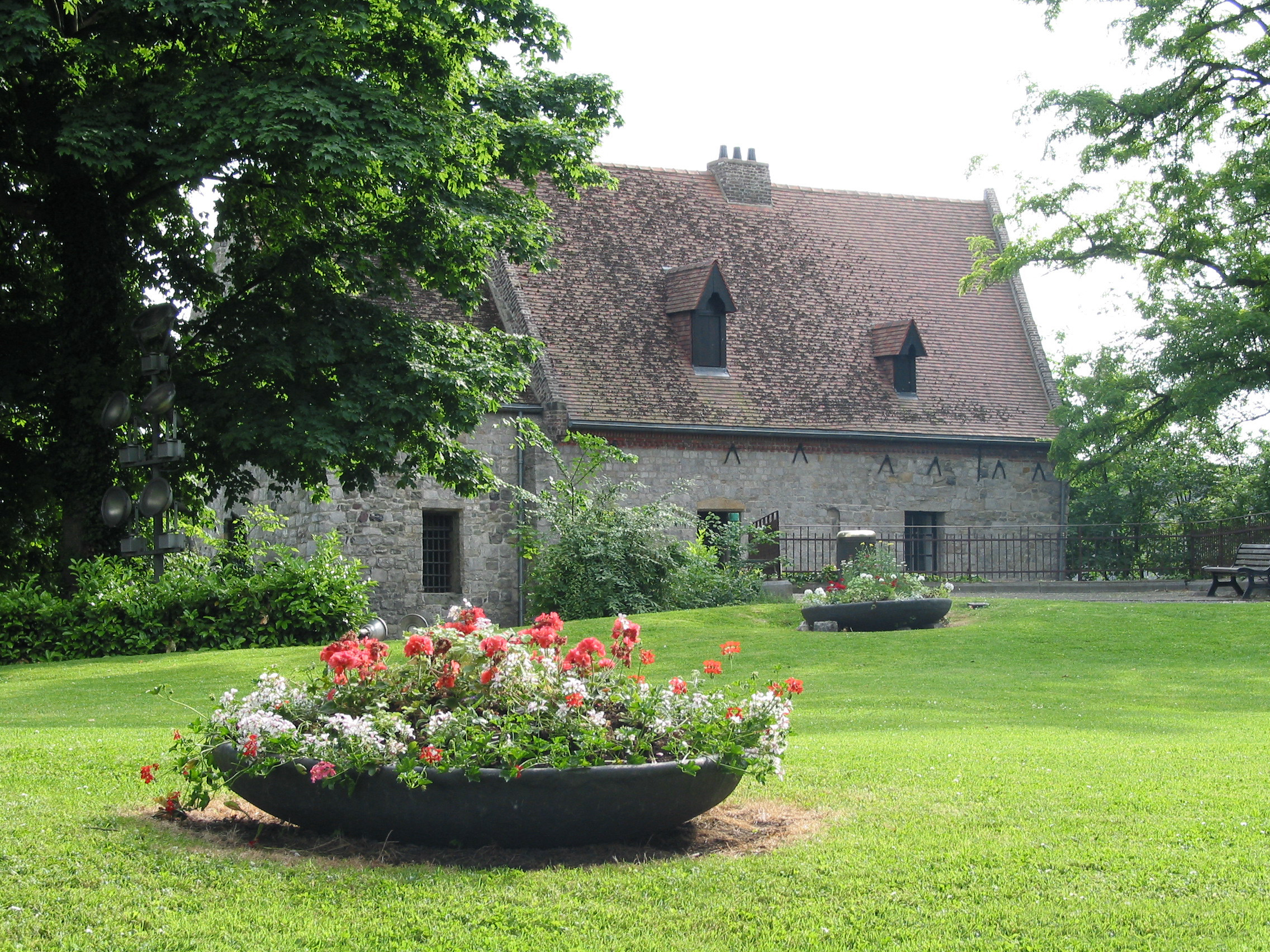
The old castle's gardens and the Romanesque St. Calixte's Chapel

=== City Hall ===
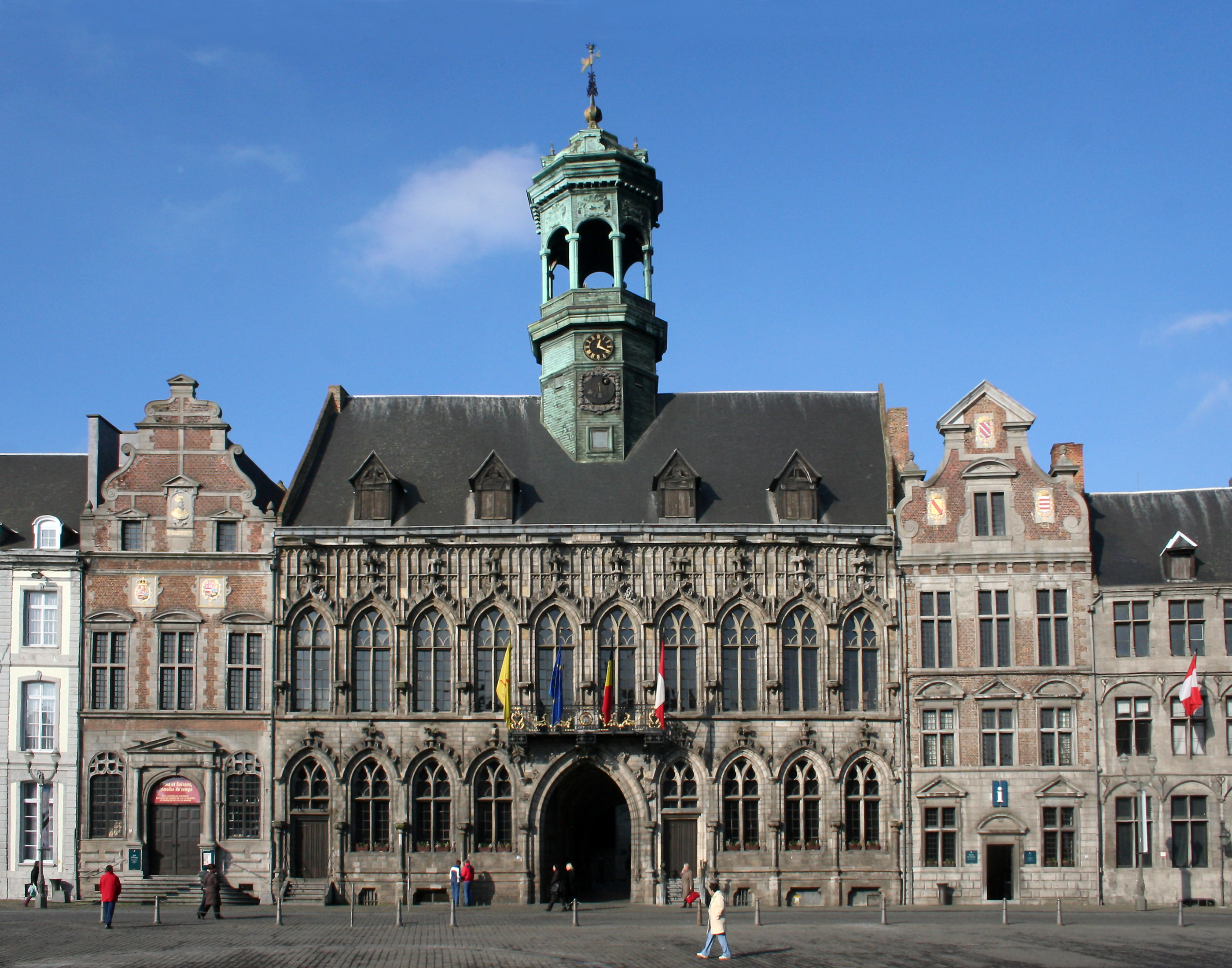
The Town Hall

==== History ====
Originally its communal organization, Mons was a City Hall called "House of Peace." Earlier the deputy mayors were on the castle of the Counts of Hainaut, and now it is only the conciergerier, Saint-Calixte chapel and some underground rooms and the chamber. This place is now Castle Park, where we can also see the Belfry. Already in the 13th century, the counts mentioned the House of Peace, located in the Rue Nimy. Other documents of the same time let one suppose that there existed two Houses of Peace, the one in the Rue Nimy and the other in the market area.

It was in 1323 that Count William I gave permission to build the House of Peace on the location of the current City Hall. This is called a "Town House" built of stones and bricks at the base, while the superstructure is of wood. This building underwent various changes during the 15th century until 1477, when the nearby shop in the arsenal exploded.

==== Current City Hall ====
The destroyed buildings were rebuilt and benefitted from new changes and additions over the centuries.

The architect of the City Hall, Matthew Layens of Leuven, was called to draw up plans. It was to be a building in Gothic style, but it seems that the plan (which was not found) was not completed, including the abandonment of the second floor, which was still intended for construction. The Renaissance campanile was added in the 18th century. It contains a bell dating from 1390, the Bancloque, and carries a clock dial overlooking the Grand-Place and a light clock. The 19th century saw various modifications of the façade, the removal of stone mullions to the floor and various stone ornaments.

In its current state, the Town Hall consists of a remarkable collection of various buildings housing a large proportion of municipal services. These buildings have undergone many changes over the centuries, restorations and additions of elements from other buildings, such as a Gothic style fireplace from castle Trazegnies, carved doors of the 16th century saved from demolition, a fireplace from the castle of Gouy-lez-Pedestrian, and another fireplace in 1603 from the Château d'Havré.

On 23 April 2006 was inaugurated a bronze statuary group by Garouste Gerard, creator of a fresco for the wedding hall. The work, evoking the combat of St. George and the dragon, is in front of City Hall at the bottom of the stair-ramps providing access to one of the entrances to City Hall.

==== Mayor's Garden ====
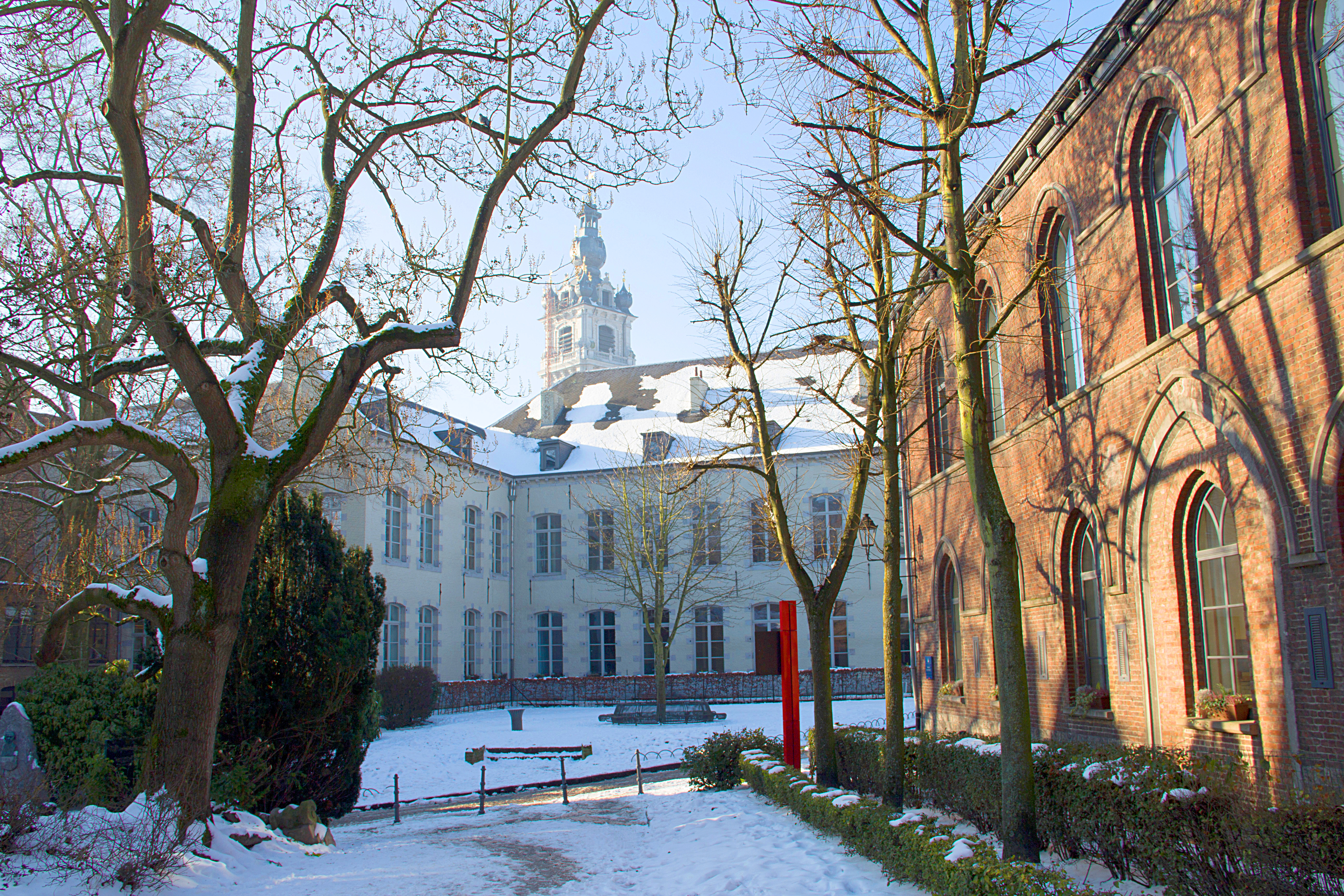
The Mayor's Garden

These buildings surround a small, irregularly shaped square, the Mayor's Garden, from which the Rue d'Enghien descends. The Ropieur Fountain, by sculptor Léon Gobert (1869–1935), can be found in the middle of the square. The ropieur symbolizes a young insolent resident of Mons, drenching passersby with water from the fountain.

=== Saint Waltrude Collegiate Church ===
Although located in the heart of the old County of Hainaut, the Saint Waltrude Collegiate Church is one of the most characteristic churches and most homogeneous of Brabantine Gothic architecture.

The collegiate was built in the 15th century on the orders of canons. Along with the nearby Belfry, it is considered as a major symbol of the city of Mons. It contains many works of Jacques Du Brœucq.

It is made of local materials like sandstone, blue stone and brick. It is designed in a classic form, which is expressed by a Latin cross sign. It measures 115 metres long, 32 metres wide and rises to 24.5 metres at the keystone. The chancel is surrounded by an ambulatory and 15 chapels.

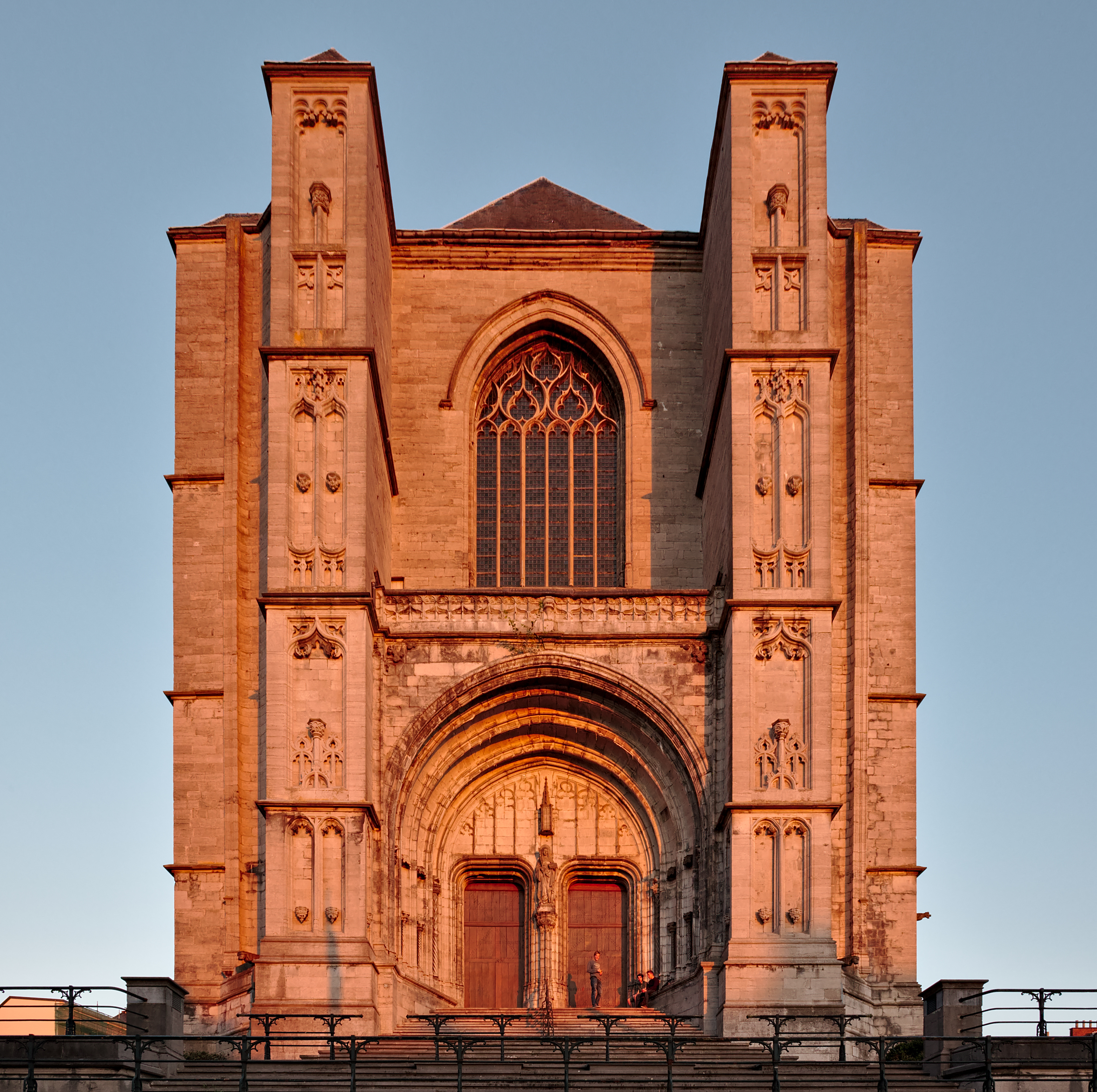
Saint Waltrude Collegiate Church

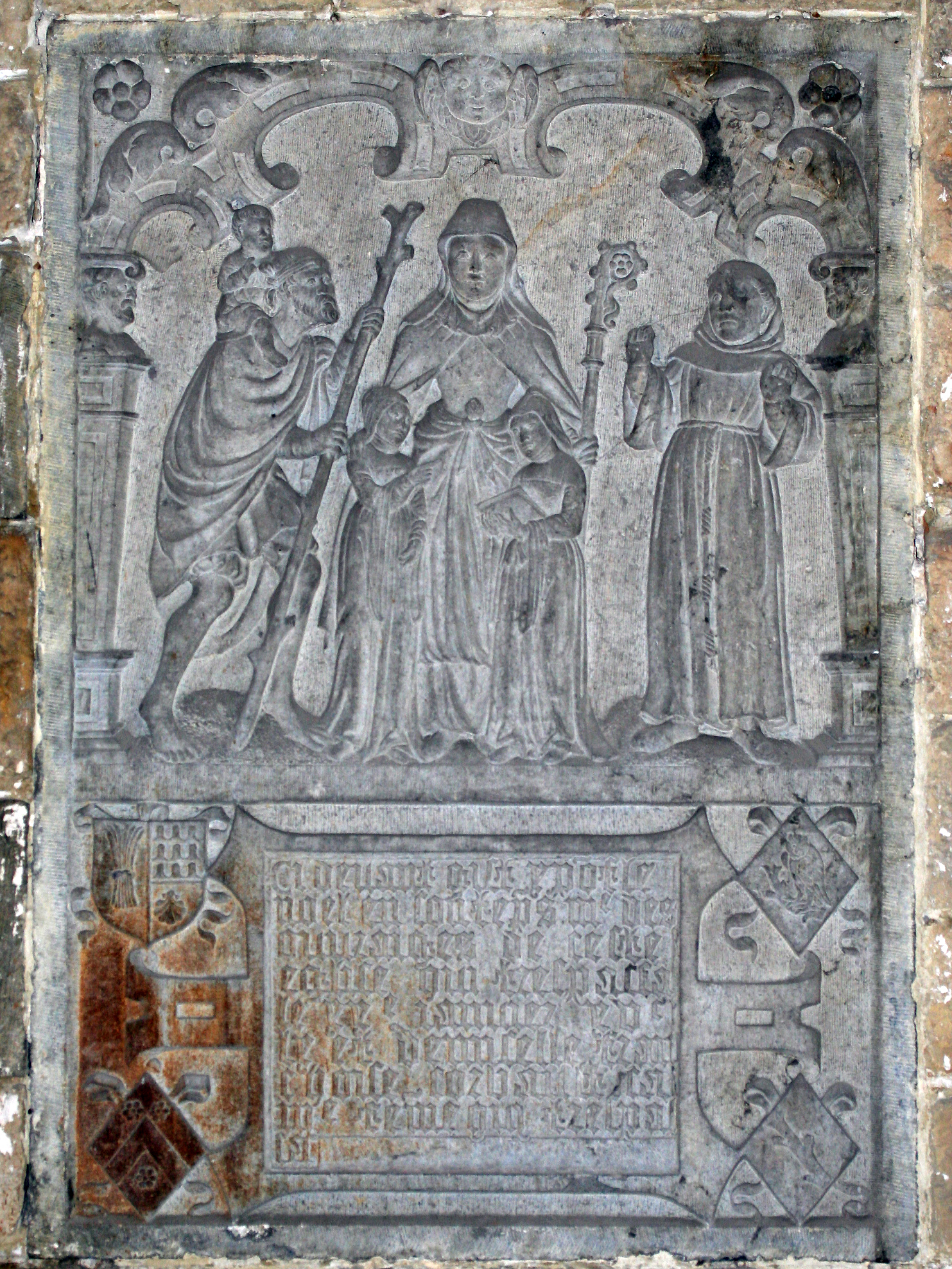
Bas-relief on the western wall in the collegiate church

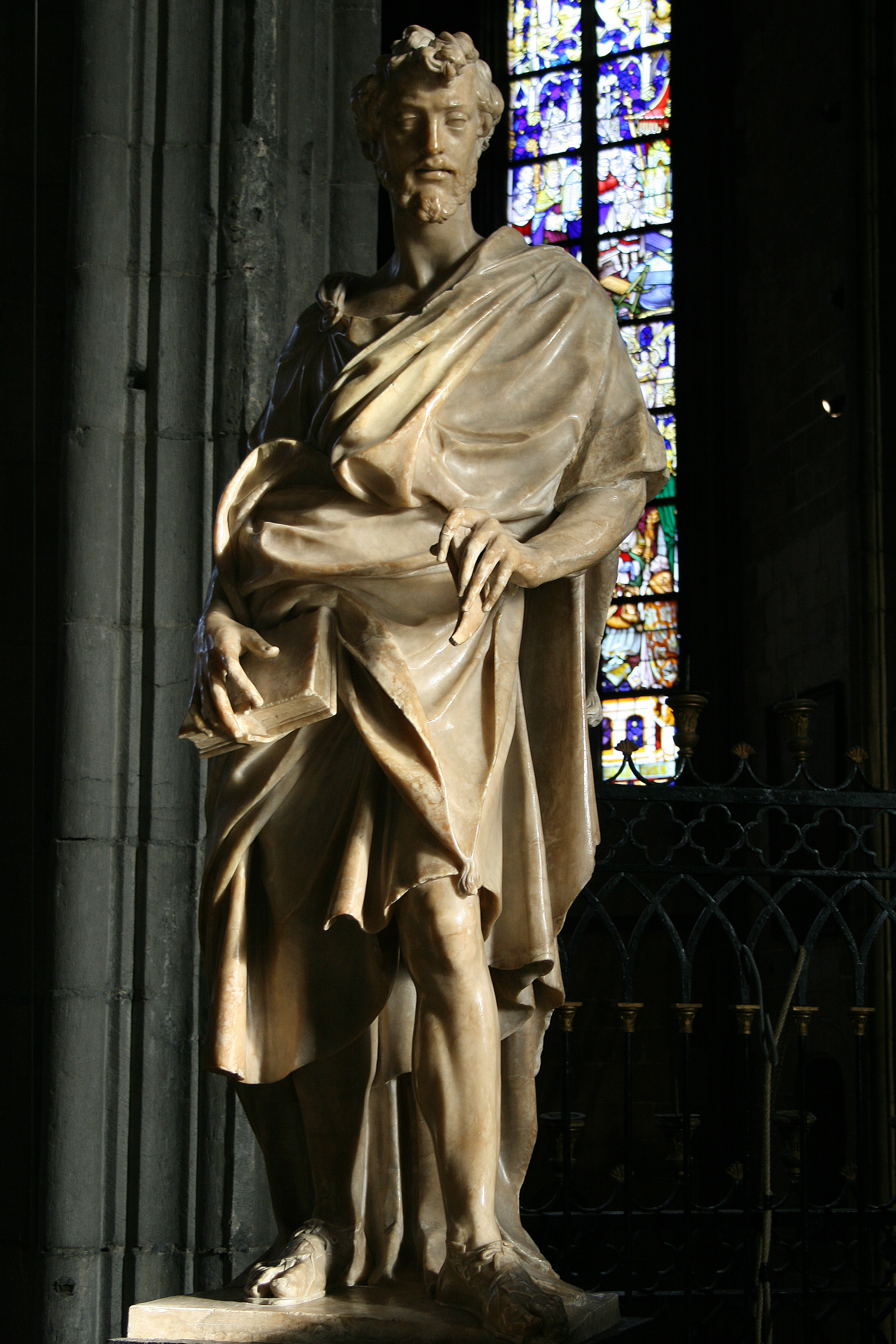
Statue of St. Bartholomew by Jacques Du Brœucq in the choir of the collegiate church

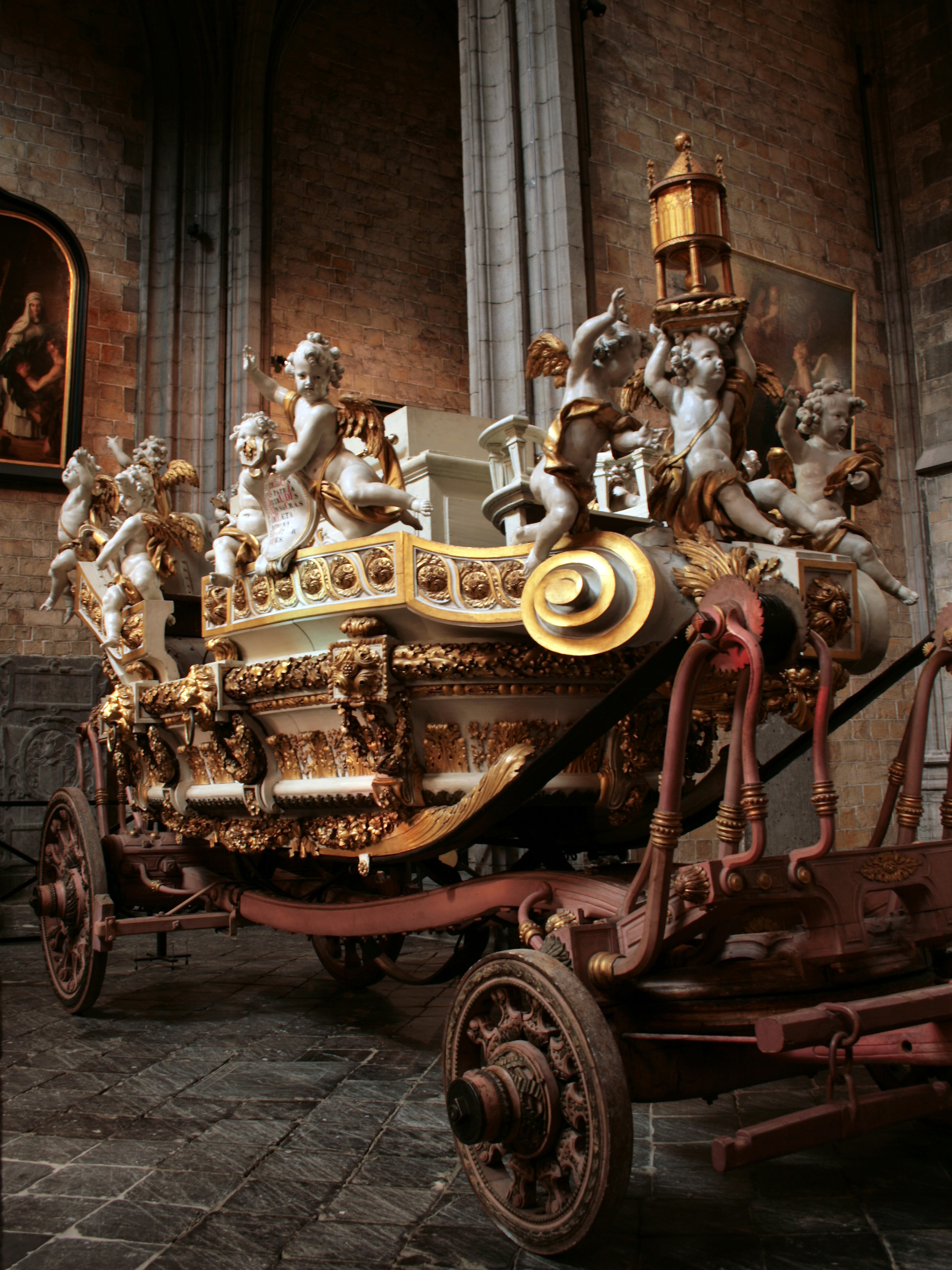
The Car d'Or (Golden Carriage) shown in the collegiate church

=== Belfry ===
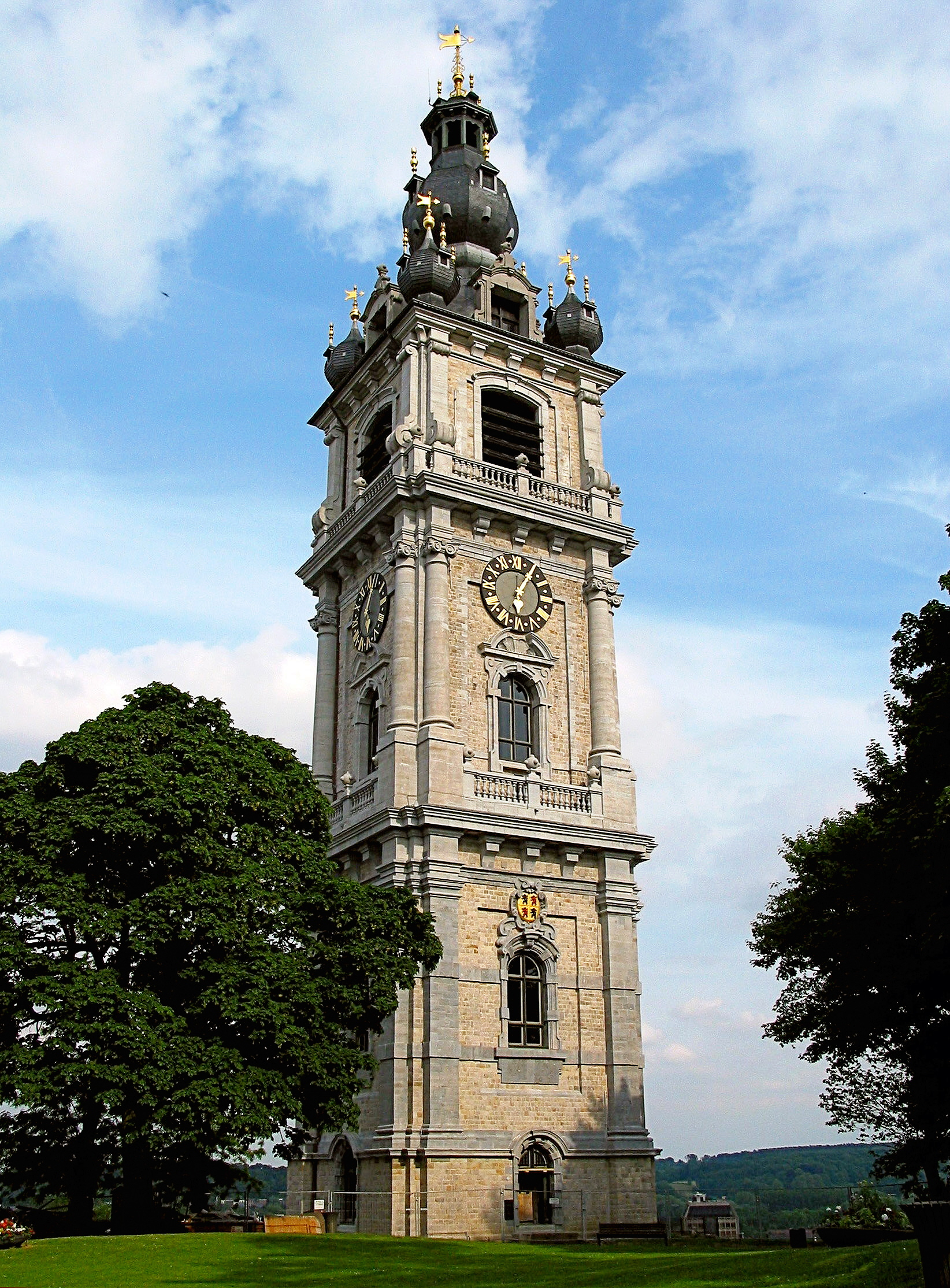
The Belfry

Also called El Catiau by Montois, it was built in the 17th century. The Belfry is the only Baroque style building in Belgium that reaches a height of 87 meters. In its top section it contains a 49 bell carillon. It was classified as a UNESCO World Heritage Site on 1 December 1999, as part of the Belfries of Belgium and France site.

Victor Hugo described the Belfry in a letter to his wife as "a coffeepot flanked by four smaller teapots."

=== Press House (Spanish House) ===
The Press House dates back to the 16th century and is a rare example of a house in traditional Spanish style in Mons. It is made in a simple architectural way using brick. This material was economical and used after the fire in 1548, because when it was rebuilt, the cost of stone had increased. In 1548, the deputy mayor had prohibited the use of flammable materials.

The buildings were restored in 1919–1920, on the plans of the communal architect E. Bertiaux and are occupied by the Maison de la Presse.

=== Water machine ===
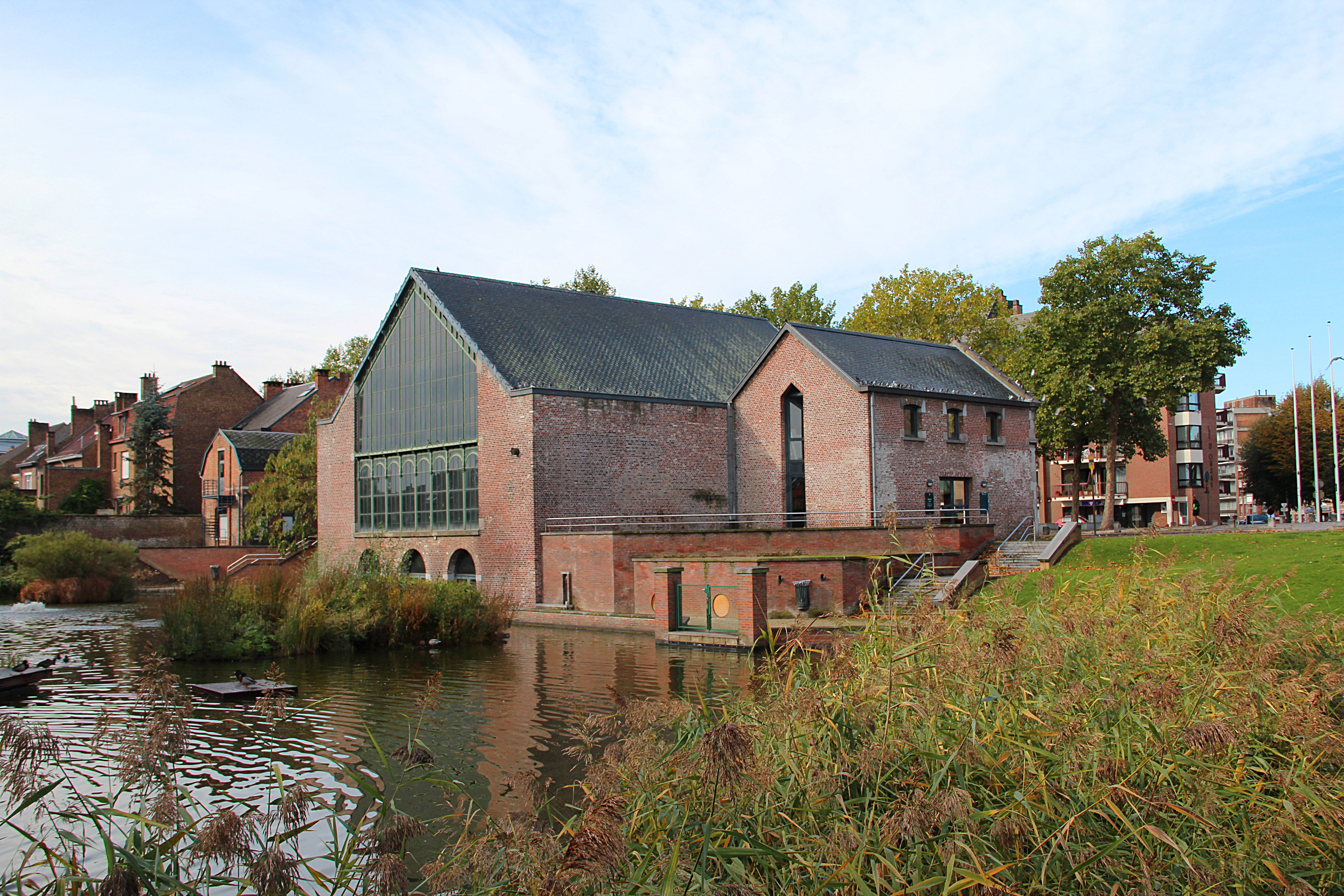
The site of the former water machine

This industrial hall is all that remains of the "machine" that supplied Mons with drinkable water from 1871, the year when the river Trouille was diverted. Designed by the architect Hubert and the engineer Celi Moullan, this impressive machinery of pipes and mains was built in metal and glass and forced the water from the valley level up to the town water tanks in the castle place yard. To source the water, Mons purchased two springs known as the "Mouse Hole" and "La Vallière," and the water was transported via hydraulic motor.

The "water machine" still bears witness to the sanitary and hygiene concerns which arose in Mons in 1865-1870 and marks the transition from medieval water supply wells, springs and hand pumps, to operation of pumps suction and force.

This progress at domestic level transformed the townspeople's way of life and changed the boundaries of Mons and Spiennes. They used to get water from wells or fountains, sometimes over a hundred yards from their homes. Soon followed another urban project: the introduction in 1828 of city gas to illuminate new avenues and streets. These two changes are made possible by the demolition of the fortifications, which releases the land, and the diversion of Trouille including the strategic role of supply ditches was then passed.

The "water machine" was restored in the early 1990s, and the building now hosts various cultural events. The machinery was dismantled.

=== Waux Hall ===
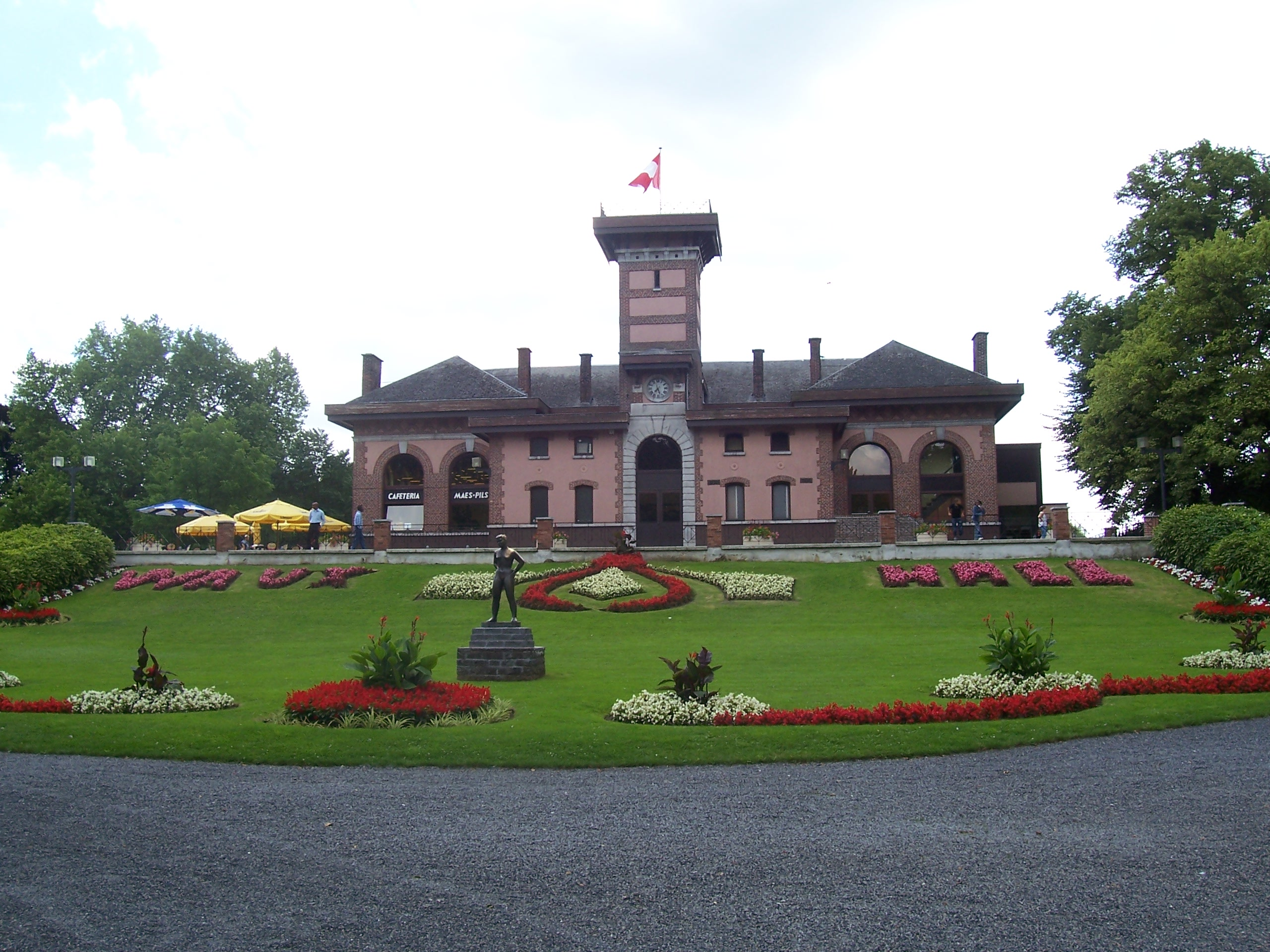
The main pavillon of the Waux-Hall

Waux Hall park was built in the 19th century (1862–1864) at the initiative of the Society of Waux Hall created for this purpose by members of the bourgeoisie. It is therefore the source of a private park. It is located at the site of Fort said that the Dutch formed an outwork the last fortification (1815–1864). Remnants of the fort still exist under the current pavillon. The gardens were designed by Louis Fuchs and the central pavilion was built by architect Joseph Hubert in tavern style.

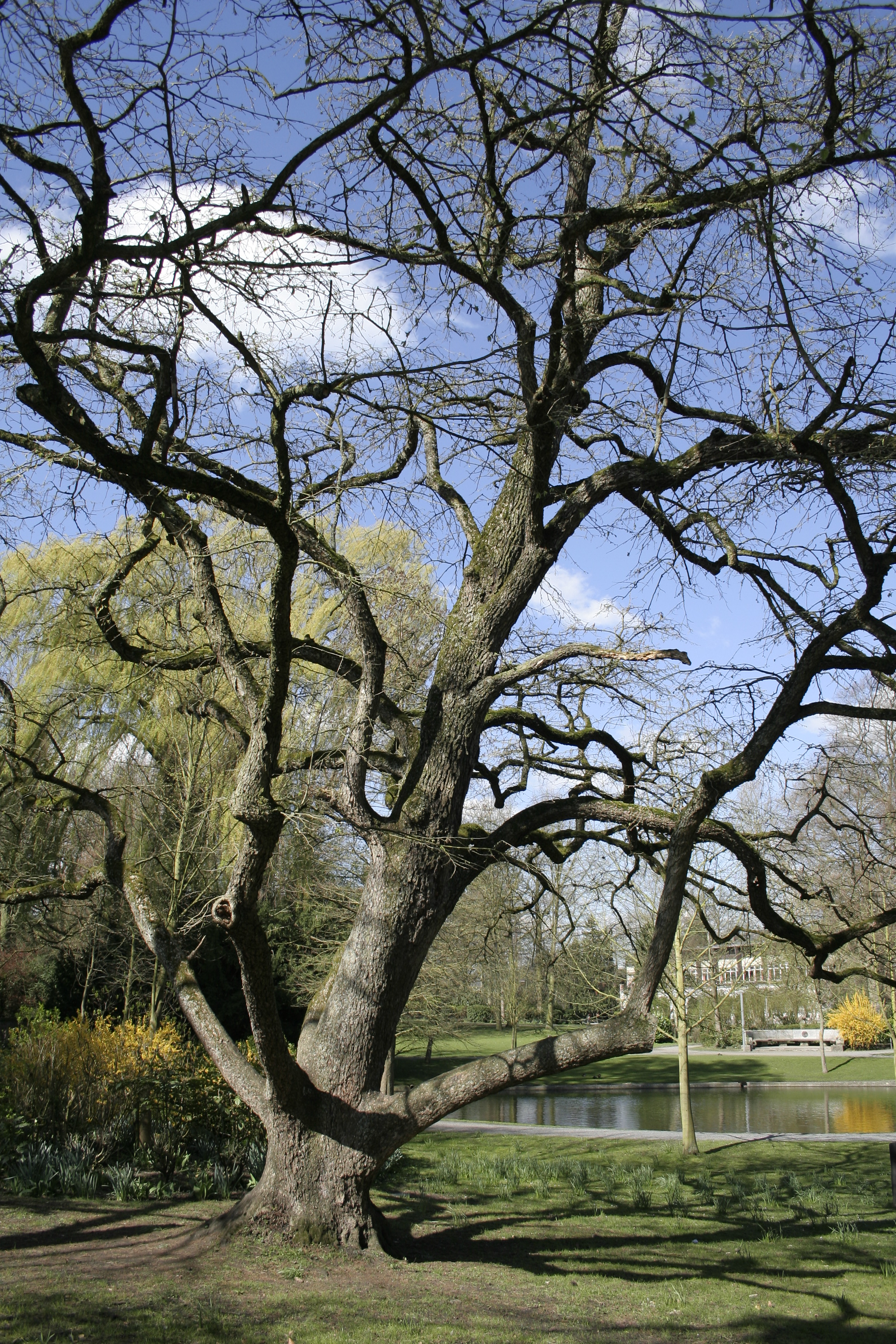
The remarkable Turkish hazel tree in the park

A 5 hectare landscaped park was built in the mid 19th century and consists of various species of age-old trees, water features, lakes and lawns. A Turkish hazel is one of the remarkable trees in the park. Various memorials and outdoor sculptures, including works of sculptors Grard, Deville, Hupet, and Guilmot Harvent, are placed.

The Technical and Vocational School of Horticulture was established in 1863, it was installed under the authority of the corporation of Waux Hall. It became communal in 1892 at the time of acquisition of Waux Hall by the city of Mons, and then came under the authority of the province of Hainaut in 2006. In 2009 this event was moved to the Grand-Place.

=== Parfaite Union ===
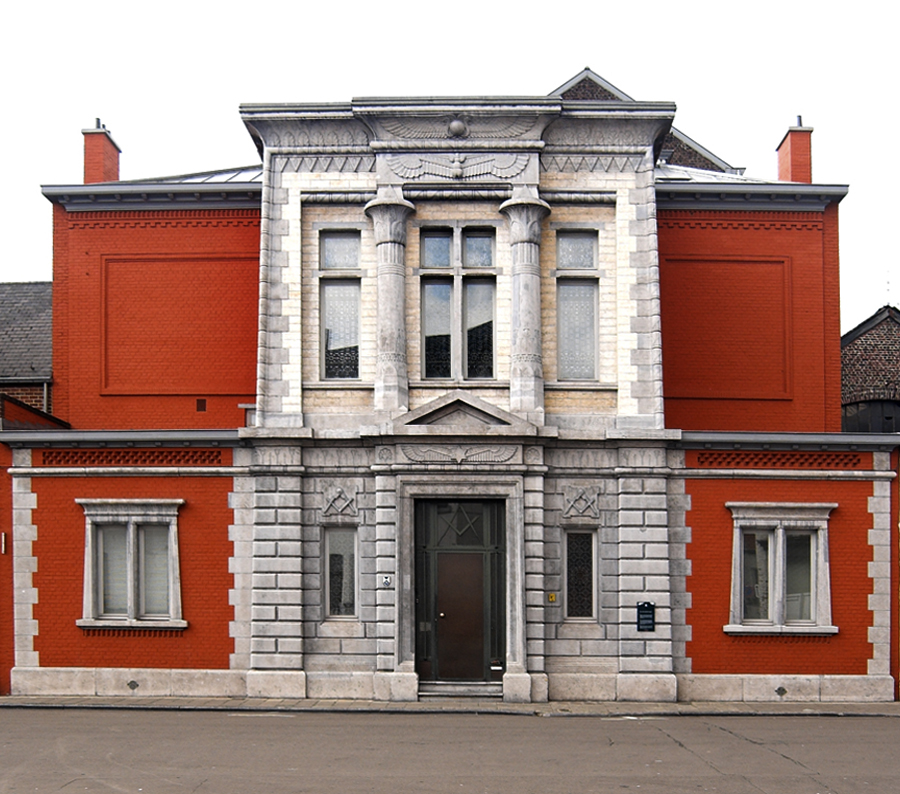
La Parfaite Union

The masonic Lodge La Parfaite Union is the oldest in Belgium and perhaps even on the continent. It was founded in 1721. At that time, Mons became a masonic centre followed by the creation of several new lodges (Vraie et parfaite harmonie (1767), À l'Orient de Mons (1783) et la Ligue équitable (1786).

After the French Revolution, the meetings were held in different locations, and an event was organised by the Parfaite Union for the construction of a permanent building. The plans of the architect Hector Puchot were retained in 1890. The neo-Egyptian style then became a reference for Masonic architecture, and we can consider the lodge of Mons as a model of its kind with its numerous motifs—"Egyptian" papyrus capitals, frieze lotus bud, etc.

=== Carré des Arts ===
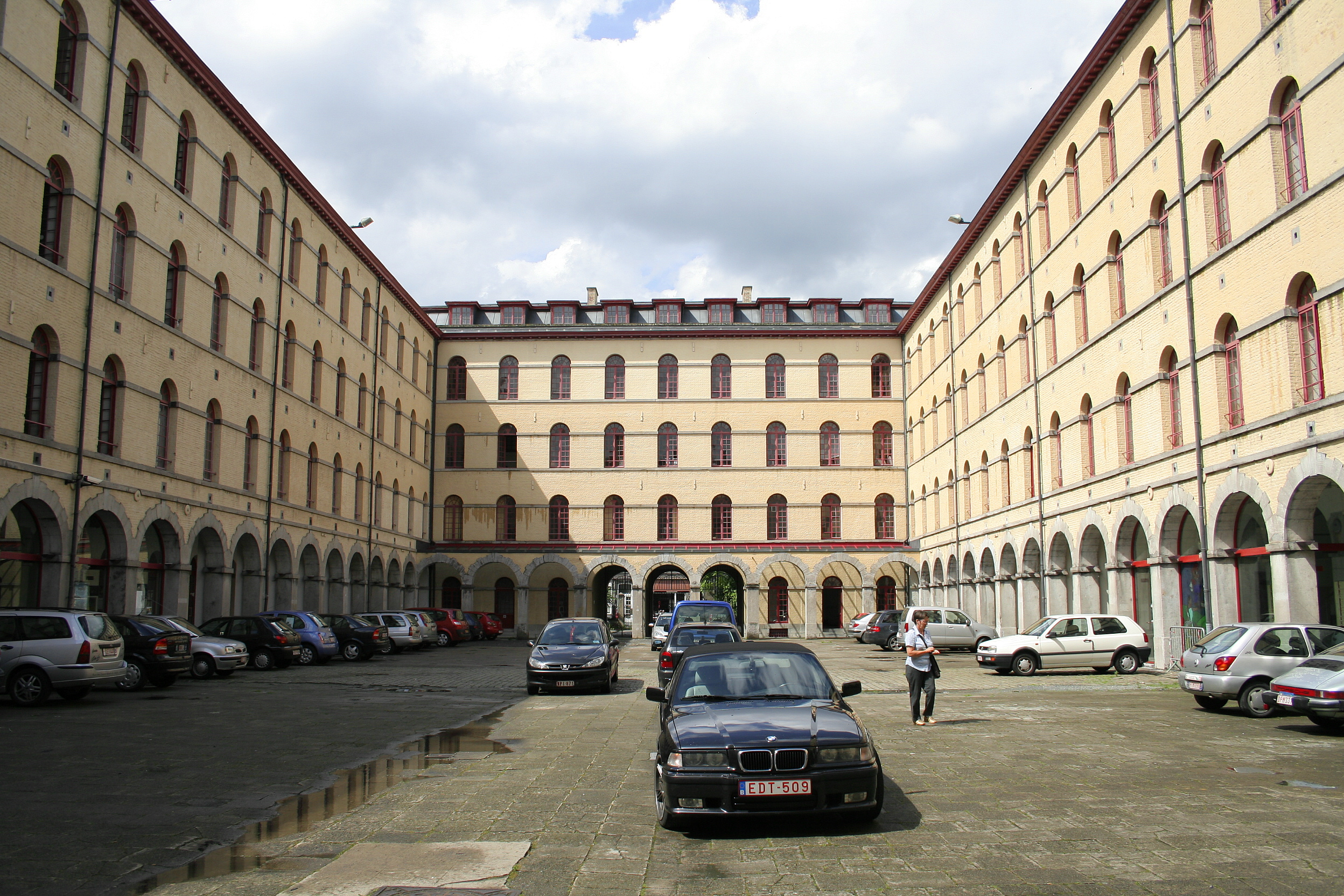
The Carré des Arts

The William Barracks, renamed the Major Sabbe Barracks after the First World War and since the 1990s called the Carré des Arts, dates from 1824 to 1827, at the time of the United Kingdom of the Netherlands. It is the work of the architect Rémi de Puydt (1789–1844). The façade and roof of the building were listed in 1983 on the advice of the Royal Commission of Monuments, Sites and Excavations.

Maintaining its military purpose until the late 1940s, the building was then used by the Royal Grammar School John Avesnes from the 1960s to the early 1990s. Since the completion of the conversion carried out between 1993 and 1995, the Carré des Arts hosts the Graduate School of Arts and visual (ESAPV) and regional television TV Borinage Mons (Tele MB).

=== Rouge-Puits ===
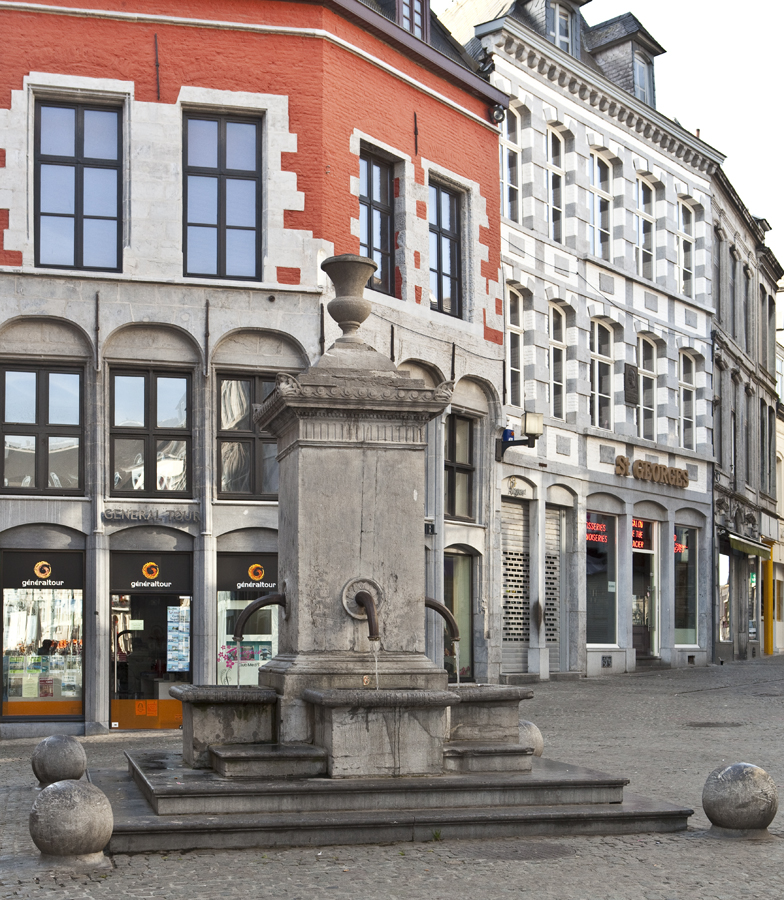
The Rouge-Puits, at the corner of the Rue de la Coupe and the Rue de la Chaussée

Three wells, fountains that decorated the streets of Mons have survived until today. This is the case of the fountain-pillory, Louis XVI style, built in 1779 by the blue stone Ouvertus architect.

Built in 1831 by Albert Jamot, this well was transferred to the central Marché-aux-Herbes in 1877 and has served as a fountain after the development of the water supply in the city during the years 1869–1870. It has regained its original location at the corner of the Coupe and the Chaussée in 1981. After the Marché aux Herbes, the fountain (not connected to the water) was placed for a few years in the park at the far end of the Rue des Quatre Fils Aymon.

=== Casemates ===
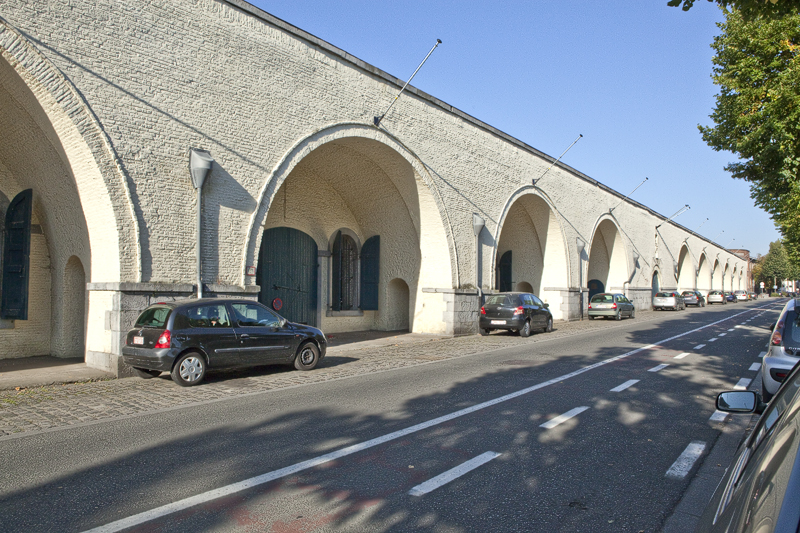
The Casemates, Place Nervienne

The casemates and the bakery are the remains of military fortifications dating from the kingdom of the Netherlands (1814–1830). The law dividing the disassembly of the fortifications dates back to 1861. They are located near the Nervienne site. The roof of the old bakery has been transformed into a public park and playground for children, while the casemates accommodate the musée de la Route.

=== Valenciennoise Tower ===
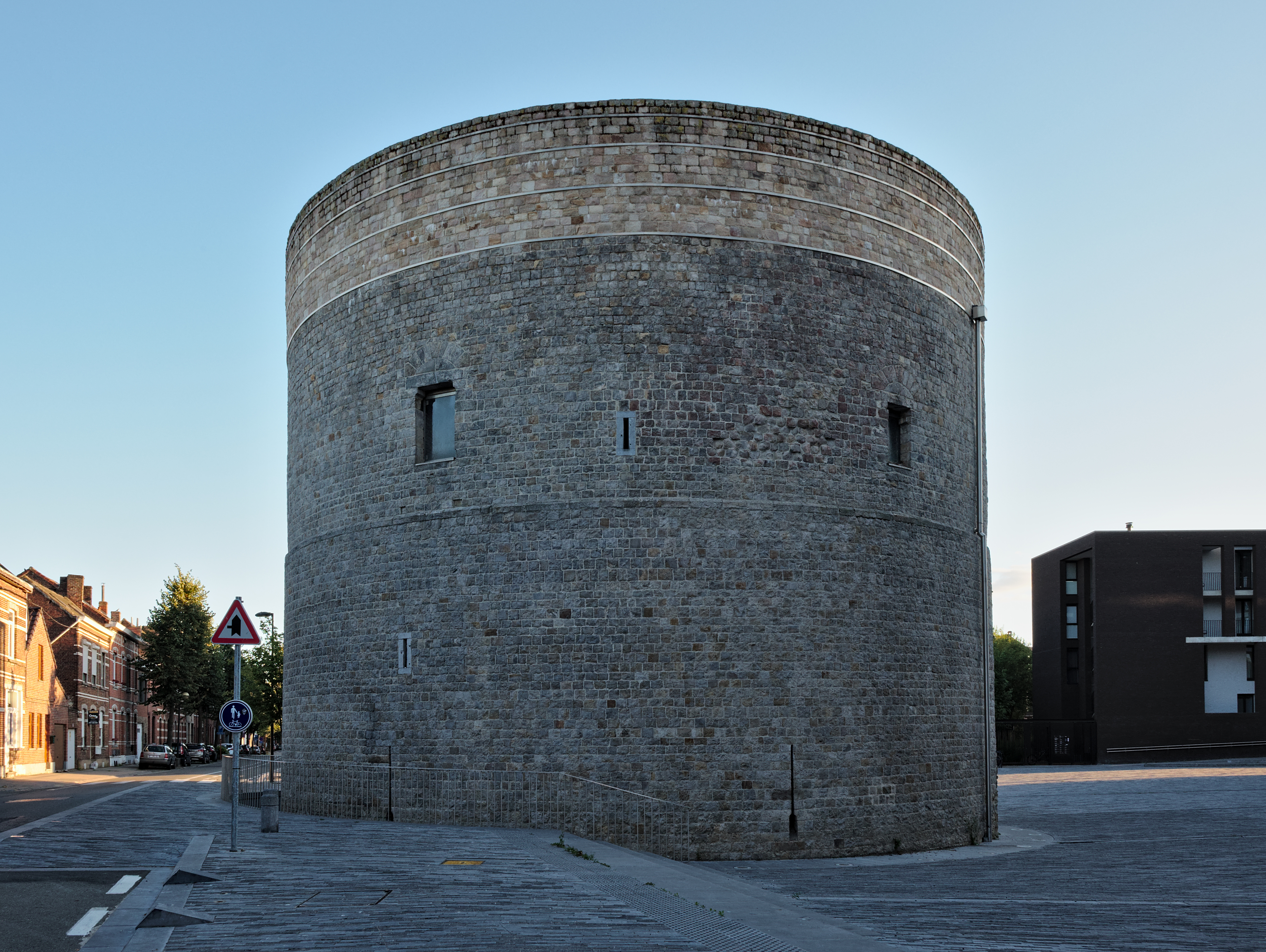
Valenciennoise Tower

This is the last existing trace of the medieval walls surrounding the city. This defensive structure built of sandstone from Bray was built around 1358. Its walls equipped with loopholes have a thickness of up to 4 meters. The tower has lost about a third of its original size. A project to install a terrace on its top open to the public had just been completed in 2009. The tower has housed a sound installation in the festival of contemporary art audio-visual CitySonics when it reopened.

=== Concourse of the Courts ===
In 1966, the Council of Ministers decided to build new buildings to house the Courts of Justice: Assize Court, Labour Court, Court of Appeal, Court of Commerce, etc. The choice is the site of the former "Hall of exposure". The Building Authority designated as architects for the project the Office Aura (John Bartholomew). The triangular shape of the land has created interior spaces, decreasing in height and width, forming a sort of "cathedral space" underlined by a continuous central luminous line. On this major axis, the "backbone" of the project, has created spaces for encounter and relaxation. The latest techniques have been implemented for the economic management of energy, giving maximum comfort to staff and the public while ensuring the development of architectural building.

Opened in May 2007, by January 2011 all buildings already had developed many problems of water seepage and stability. Thus one of the gateways weighing a hundred kilos came off its hinges and nearly fell on a lawyer who entered, cracks opened between concrete blocks, the joints of windows let in wind and water when it rains in the concourse, etc. The lack of any maintenance contracts might be a significant cause of these problems, since minor problems might otherwise have been prevented from getting worse.

== Patron saint ==
The patron saint of Mons is Waltrude.

== People born in Mons ==
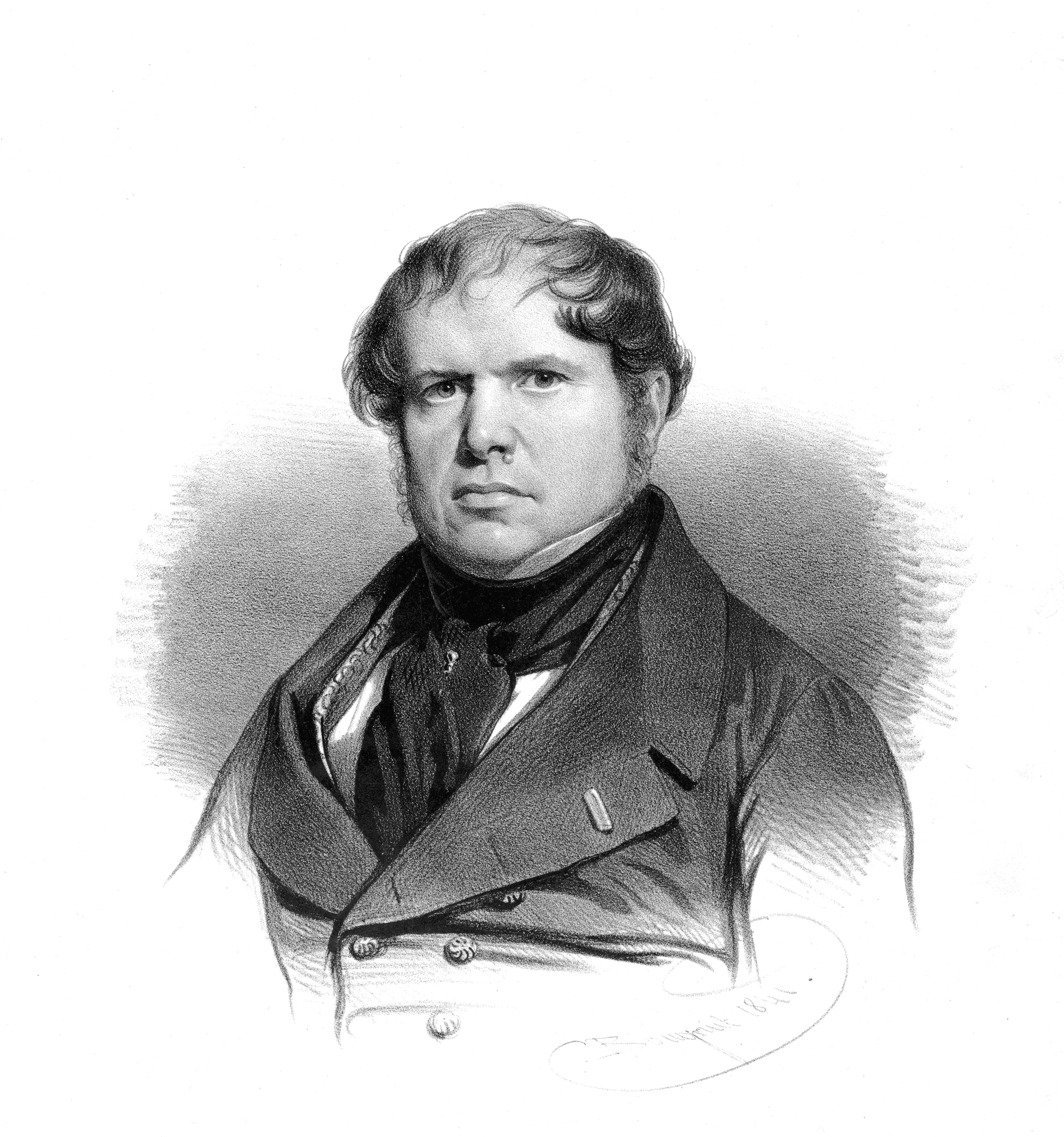
Francois-Joseph Fetis

- Gilles Binchois, composer ((c. 1400 – 1460); birth in Mons is uncertain)
- Guido de Bres, theologian (1522 to 31 May 1567)
- Jacques Du Brœucq, painter and architect (16th century, birth in Mons is uncertain)
- François-Joseph Fétis, musicologist and critic (1784–1871)
- Giuseppe Grisoni, painter and sculptor (17th century)
- François-Philippe de Haussy, first governor of the National Bank of Belgium (18th century)
- Orlando di Lasso, composer (1532–1594)
- Eugène Lafont, S.J., Jesuit missionary to India, educator and leading figure in the field of science in that nation
- Émile Motte, painter (19th century)
- Davide Moscardelli, Italian Footballer
- Nicolas Neufchatel, painter (16th century)
- Charles Plisnier, Walloon writer, Prix Goncourt and Walloon movement activist
- Jan Provoost, painter (15th-16th century)
- Paul Émile de Puydt, botanist, economist, and writer (1810–1891)
- Vincent Rousseau, long-distance athlete
- Marie Vuillemin, member of the Bonnot Gang
- Jean Yeuwain, writer (16th - 17th century)

== Twin cities ==
- China: Changsha
- France: Briare
- France: Thoissey
- France: Vannes
- United Kingdom: Sefton
- United States: Little Rock, Arkansas

== See also ==
- Angels of Mons
- Borinage
- Grand Hornu
- Mons Meg
- Mundaneum (Paul Otlet)
