= Émile Motte =

Belgian painter

- Born: Émile Motte; 1860; Mons, Belgium
- Died: 1931 (aged 70–71); Brussels, Belgium
- Occupation: Painter

Émile Motte (1860, Mons, Belgium – 1931, Schaerbeek, Belgium) was a Belgian painter. He was the director of l'Académie de Mons. The Musée d'Orsay in Paris has one of his paintings, the self-portrait Autopsychic Project (1895), in its collection.

== Works ==
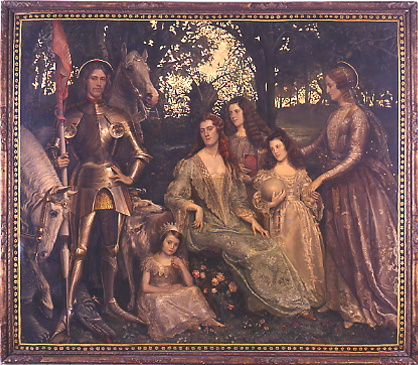
Aux temps des aieux (Musée des Beaux-Arts, Mons)

- L'Homme à la loupe
- La paix divine
- La Jeune fille à la robe d'argent (1894)
- Aux temps des aïeux
