= Institut Reine Astrid Mons =

The Institut Reine Astrid Mons is a higher school located in Mons, Belgium. The school is part of the Haute Ecole Roi Baudouin.

== Degrees ==
- Bachelor's degree in Accounting
- Bachelor's degree in Computer Programming
- Bachelor's degree in Secretarial Management
- Bachelor's degree in Automotive Expertise and Thermal Engines
