= Alphonse Briart =

Belgian geologist (1825-1898)

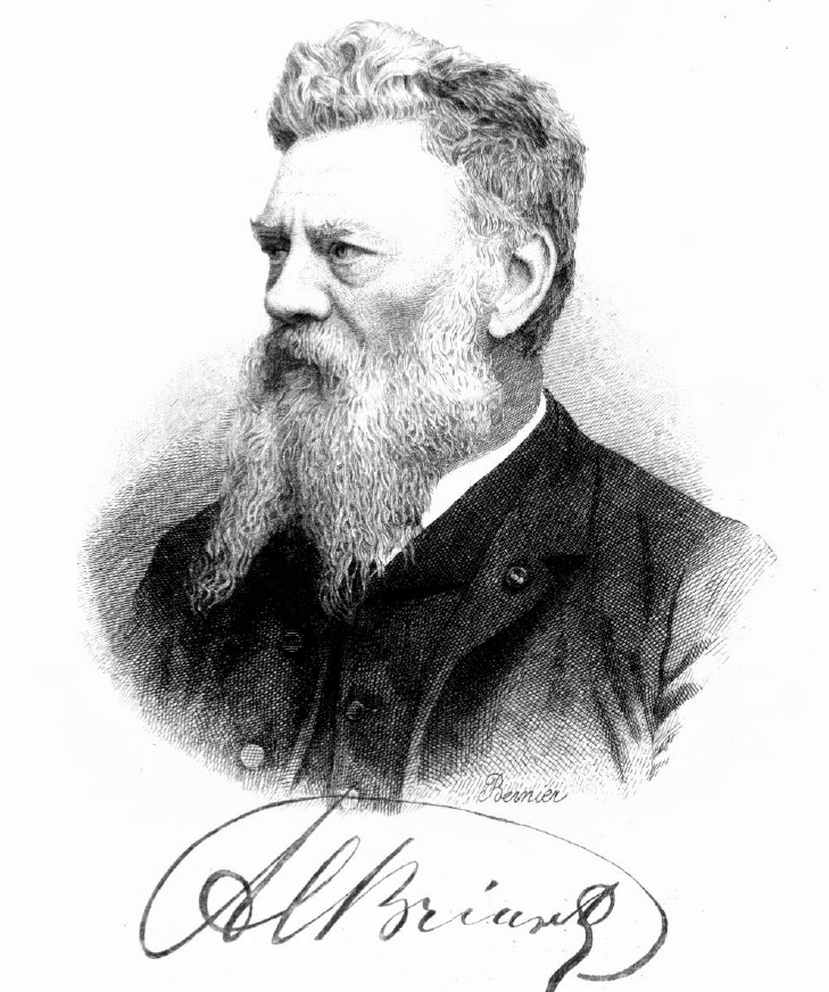
- Born: 25 February 1825; Chapelle-lez-Herlaimont, Hainaut Province, Belgium, United Kingdom of the Netherlands
- Died: 15 March 1898 (aged 73); Morlanwelz, Hainaut Province, Belgium
- Scientific career
- Fields: Geology

Alphonse Briart (1825–1898) was supervisor of the coal mines at Bascoup and Mariemont near Morlanwelz in the Hainaut province of Belgium, and a geologist who studied that region. During the period 1863–1896 he and Francois Cornet published a number of books and papers describing fossils and geological structures found near Mons. They devised theories - now generally accepted - as to the geological history of the region. After Cornet's death in 1887, Briart continued to write alone.

The mineral Briartite is named for his grandson, Gaston Briart. In 1890 his son Paul took part in Delcommune's Katanga expedition.

== Life events ==
Briart was born at Chapelle-lez-Herlaimont, then in the United Kingdom of the Netherlands on 25 February 1825, the son of a military surgeon. In 1844 he graduated from the École des Mines in Mons as an engineer. For most of his career, he worked for the Mariemont & Bascoup coal-mining company. In 1868 he was appointed the company's Chief Engineer, and in 1888 the company's president.

He married Elise Deltenre in 1855.

His first geological publication, in collaboration with Fr. Cornet, was published in 1863. In 1866 the two of them received the gold medal of the Society of Sciences, Arts and Letters of Hainaut (French: Société des sciences, des arts et des lettres du Hainaut) for a paper on the Cretaceous terrain of Hainaut.

In 1867, together with Cornet and A. Houzeau de Lehaie, Briart undertook the excavation of the Neolithic flint mines of Spiennes, and at nearby Mesvin, during the construction of the railway line between Mons and Charleroi. Findings were presented to the International Prehistoric Congress held in Brussels in 1872.

Briart became a corresponding member of the Royal Academy of Belgium in 1867, and a full member in 1874. In 1889 he became head of the Sciences section. He was a founding member of the Société géologique de Belgique (1871).

In 1895 he undertook a geological expedition in Chile.

He died at Morlanwelz on 15 March 1898. His paleontological collection was acquired by the École des Mines de Mons.

== Honours ==
In 1875 Briart became a knight, in 1890 an officer, and in 1897 commander of the Order of Leopold.

== Publications ==
- Communication relative à la grande faille limite au sud le terrain houiller belge (1863)
- Note sur la découverte dans le Hainaut, en dessous des sables rapportés par Dumont au système landenien, d’un calcaire grossier avec faune tertiaire (1865)
- Description minéralogique et stratigraphique de l'étage inférieur du terrain crétacé (1867)
- Description des fossiles du calcaire grossier de Mons (1871)
- Rapport sur les découvertes géologiques & archéologiques faites à Spiennes en 1867 (1872), on Google Books
- Sur le relief du sol en Belgique après les temps paléozoïques (1877)
- Etude sur les limons Hesbayens et les temps quaternaires en Belgique (1892)
- La Géologie des environs de Fontaine-l'Évêque et de Landelies (1894)
