= John Pull =

British archaeologist (1899–1960)

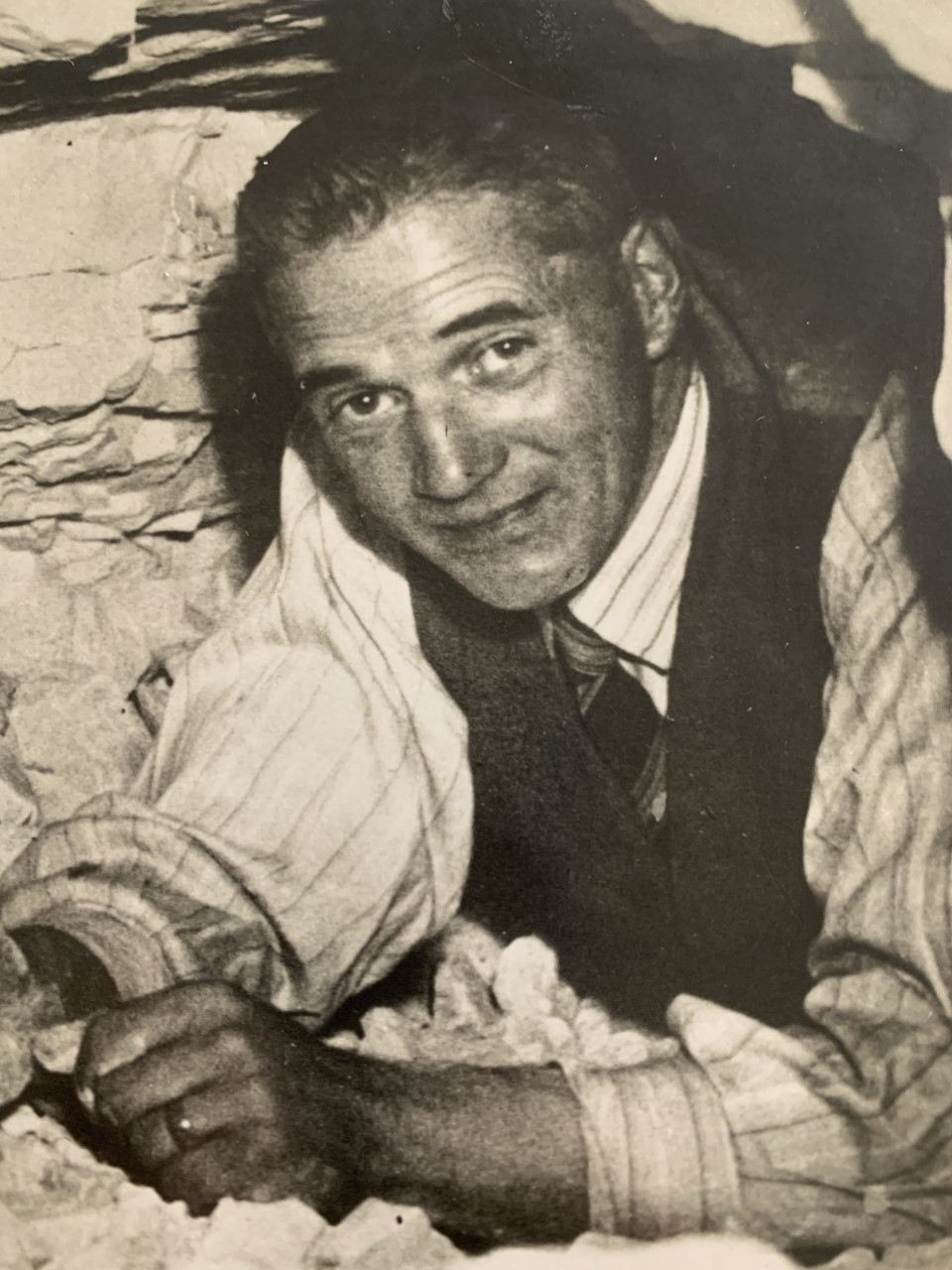
- Pull in Sussex, 1922
- Born: 25 June 1899; Arundel, United Kingdom
- Died: 10 November 1960 (aged 61); Durrington, United Kingdom
- Cause of death: Shot during a bank robbery
- Scientific career
- Fields: Archaeology
- Military career
- Allegiance: United Kingdom
- Branch: British Army
- Conflicts: World War I

John Henry Pull (25 June 1899 – 10 November 1960) was a British amateur archaeologist. After service as a soldier in World War I, where he learnt surveying skills, he worked as a gramophone salesman, a postman, and later a security guard, but his main interest was always archaeology. He was a key member of the Worthing Archaeological Society. He was responsible for the finding and excavation of some of the most important neolithic sites in Southern Britain including the flint mines at Blackpatch, Harrow Hill, Church Hill, Cissbury in Sussex, England, in 1922. Because he was not a professional archaeologist, he was unpopular with some of the experts in the field at the time, who constantly shrugged off Pull's work as amateur and unimportant.

In the end, much of Pull's work and findings were given to Worthing Museum and Art Gallery which holds a large archive. The main results of the Pull's excavations at Blackpatch, Church Hill and Cissbury between 1922 and 1956 housed in the archive were finally published in 2001 by Miles Russell of Bournemouth University. The earthworks comprising his first investigated site at Blackpatch were bulldozed over in the 1950s. Fifty years later, a Time Team episode focused on the area of Pull's work and was able to confirm some of his presumptions about the site.

Pull's work was cut short when he was shot dead during a bank robbery while working as a bank guard at Lloyds Bank, Durrington, Worthing. Victor John Terry, a 20-year-old career criminal, was subsequently tried for Pull's murder, then convicted and sentenced to death. On 25 May 1961, Terry was executed by Harry Allen on the gallows at Wandsworth Prison.
