= Flint mining =

Flint mining is the process of extracting flint from underground. Flint mines can be as simple as a pit on the surface or an area of quarrying, or it may refer to a series of shafts and tunnels used to extract flint.

Flint has been mined since the Palaeolithic, but was most common during the Neolithic. Flint was especially valued in prehistory for its use in weaponry. Although flint is not as valuable a resource in modern times, a few flint mines remain in operation even today (for example at Miorcani).

== List of flint mines ==
- Austria
  - Mauer-Antonshöhe
  - "Am Feuerstein" in Kleinwalsertal (Vorarlberg)
- Belgium
  - The Neolithic flint mines of Spiennes
  - Jandrain-Jandrenouille (Orp-Jauche)
- Denmark
  - Hov (near Thisted)
- Egypt
  - Taramsa (near Qena)
  - Nazlet Khater (Upper Egypt)
- France
  - Flint mines of Bretteville-le-Rabet located between Caen and Falaise, Calvados
  - Flint mines of Jablines
  - Le Grand-Pressigny
- Germany
  - Lengfeld (near Bad Abbach).
  - Abensberg-Arnhofen near Abensberg
  - Asch (near Blaubeuren)
  - Baiersdorf (near Essing)
  - Kleinkems in Efringen-Kirchen
  - Lousberg in Aachen
  - Bottmersdorf
  - Osterberg
  - On Rügen island there are the exposed flint fields between Mukran and Prora
  - Schernfeld
- Great Britain
  - Beer (Devon)
  - Blackpatch, West Sussex
  - Grimes Graves near Brandon, close to the border between Norfolk and Suffolk
  - Cissbury
  - Church Hill, West Sussex
  - Harrow Hill, West Sussex
  - Penmaenmawr in Conwy County Borough, Wales
- Hungary
  - Tata
  - Szentgál
- Netherlands
  - Rijckholt Sint-Geertruid mines
  - Valkenburg mines
- Pakistan
  - Flint quarries in Rohri Hills and Ongar (Sindh province)
- Poland
  - Krzemionki
  - Wierzbica "Zele"
  - Orońsko II
  - Skałecznica Duża
  - Korycizna
  - Sąspów
  - Krunio
  - Borownia
  - Bębło
  - Rybniki
- Romania
  - Outside the village of Miorcani, there is a modern flint mine
  - Piatra Tomii near the village of Răcătau
- Spain
  - Casa Montero
- Switzerland
  - between Olten and Wangen bei Olten
  - Lägern between Wettingen and Regensberg
  - Löwenburg (Pleigne, Canton of Jura)
- USA
  - Alibates Flint Quarries National Monument

== See also ==
- Stone Fields in the Schmale Heath and Extension - nature reserve
