= Church Hill, West Sussex =

Archaeological site in West Sussex, England

Church Hill
- Location within West Sussex
- 50°51′48″N 0°25′5″W
- Periods: Neolithic; Bronze Age
- Location: near Findon, West Sussex
- OS grid reference: TQ 114 083

Scheduled monument
- Designated: 22 January 1935
- Reference no.: 1015238

Church Hill is an archaeological site, of the Neolithic and Bronze Age periods, in West Sussex, England. It is on the South Downs near the village of Findon and about 3 miles (4.8 km) north-west of Worthing. It is a scheduled monument.

== Description ==
=== Flint mine ===
There is a group of about 36 infilled shafts of a flint mine; the ground has been levelled by modern cultivation, but the shafts are visible on aerial photographs. There was excavation by John Pull during 1932–1939 and 1945–1949; he excavated six shafts. There was further investigation during 1984–1986.

The shafts were found to be 0.9–1.8 metres (2 ft 11 in – 5 ft 11 in) deep; galleries led from them along seams of flint. There were pottery sherds at the shaft bottoms, from the Late Neolithic period and Early to Middle Bronze Age.

This is one of several flint mines in the area; others known nearby are at Blackpatch and Cissbury (both investigated by John Pull), and on Harrow Hill.

=== Bowl barrow ===
A bowl barrow, largely levelled by modern ploughing, is situated in the south-east of the area of the mine, partly over an infilled mine shaft. It is known to have once been a circular mound, diameter about 15.5 metres (51 ft). A beaker, with a cremation with two flint-axes, was discovered in the infilled shaft, showing continuation of the site into the Beaker period.
