= Neolithic flint mines of Spiennes =

Archaeological site in Belgium

Neolithic Flint Mines at Spiennes (Mons)
UNESCO World Heritage Site
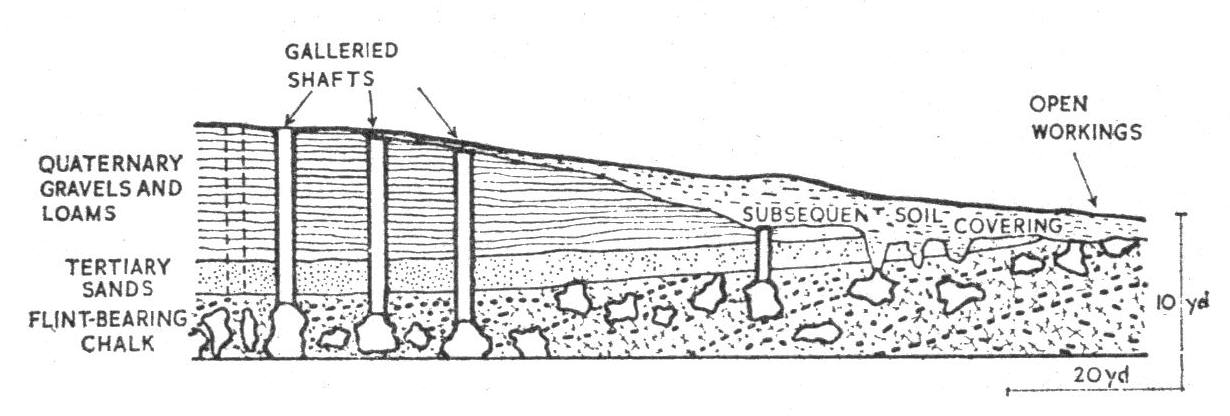
- Section of mines at Spiennes

- Location within Belgium
- Location: Spiennes, Mons, Hainaut, Wallonia, Belgium
- Criteria: Cultural: (i), (iii), (iv)
- Reference: 1006
- Inscription: 2000 (24th Session)
- Area: 172 ha (430 acres)
- Website: www.minesdespiennes.org
- Coordinates: 50.41983°N 3.98183°E

The Neolithic flint mines of Spiennes are among the largest and earliest Neolithic flint mines which survive in north-western Europe, located close to the Walloon village of Spiennes, southeast of Mons, Belgium. The mines were active during the mid and late Neolithic between 4,300 and 2,200 BC. Declared to be "remarkable for the diversity of technological solutions used for extraction" the site and its surroundings were inducted into the UNESCO's list of World Heritage Sites in 2000.

== Description ==
Discovered in 1843, the first excavations were undertaken by the mining engineer Alphonse Briart and two others during railway construction in 1867, with results presented to the International Prehistoric Congress held in Brussels in 1872. Intermittent excavations have been carried out up to the present day.

The Mines of Spiennes cover some 100 ha (250 acres) of downland four miles south-east of the city of Mons. The site is dotted with millions of scraps of worked flint and numerous mining pits, that Neolithic settlers have gradually turned into vertical mine shafts to depths of over 10 m (33 ft). Underneath is an elaborate man-made network of caverns accessible via the many shafts.

A seminal stage of human inventiveness, technological and cultural application and progress, the transition between opencast and underground mining for flint nodules is impressively displayed and documented. Research has illustrated Neolithic techniques for the cutting of the flint and the extraction of large slabs of flint, that weighed up to hundreds of kilos. The nodules were extracted using flint picks. The stones were then knapped into rough-out shapes of axes, and finally polished to achieve the final state.

The rough-outs were exchanged over a wide area, about 150 km (93 mi), and were often polished at their destination. Polishing strengthens the final product, making the axe- or adze-head last longer. The smooth surface also aids the cutting action by lowering friction with the wood. The axes were used initially for forest clearance during the Neolithic period, and for shaping wood for structural applications, such as timber for huts and canoes.

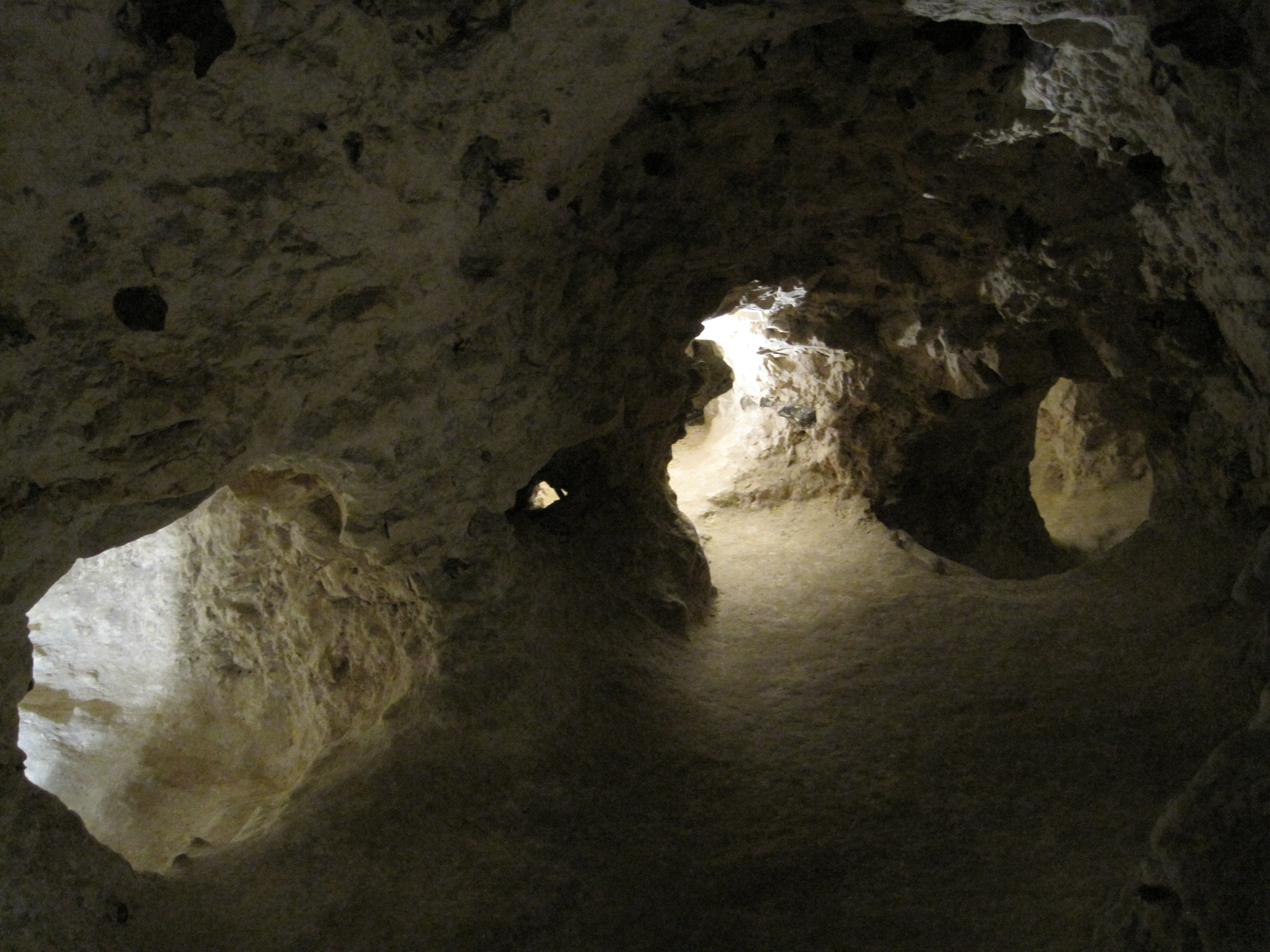
Flint mines of Champ à Cailloux

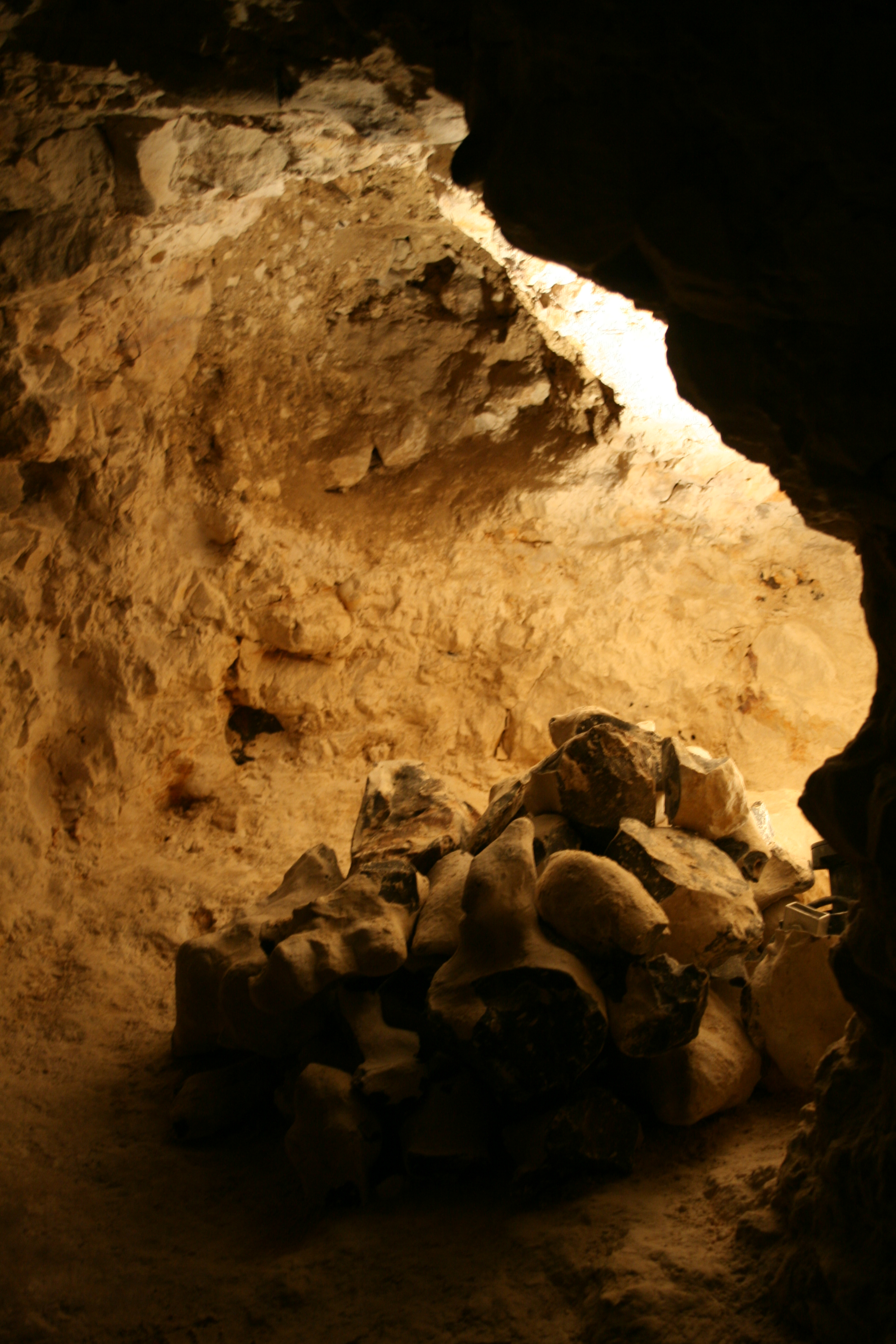
Mines of Champ à Cailloux

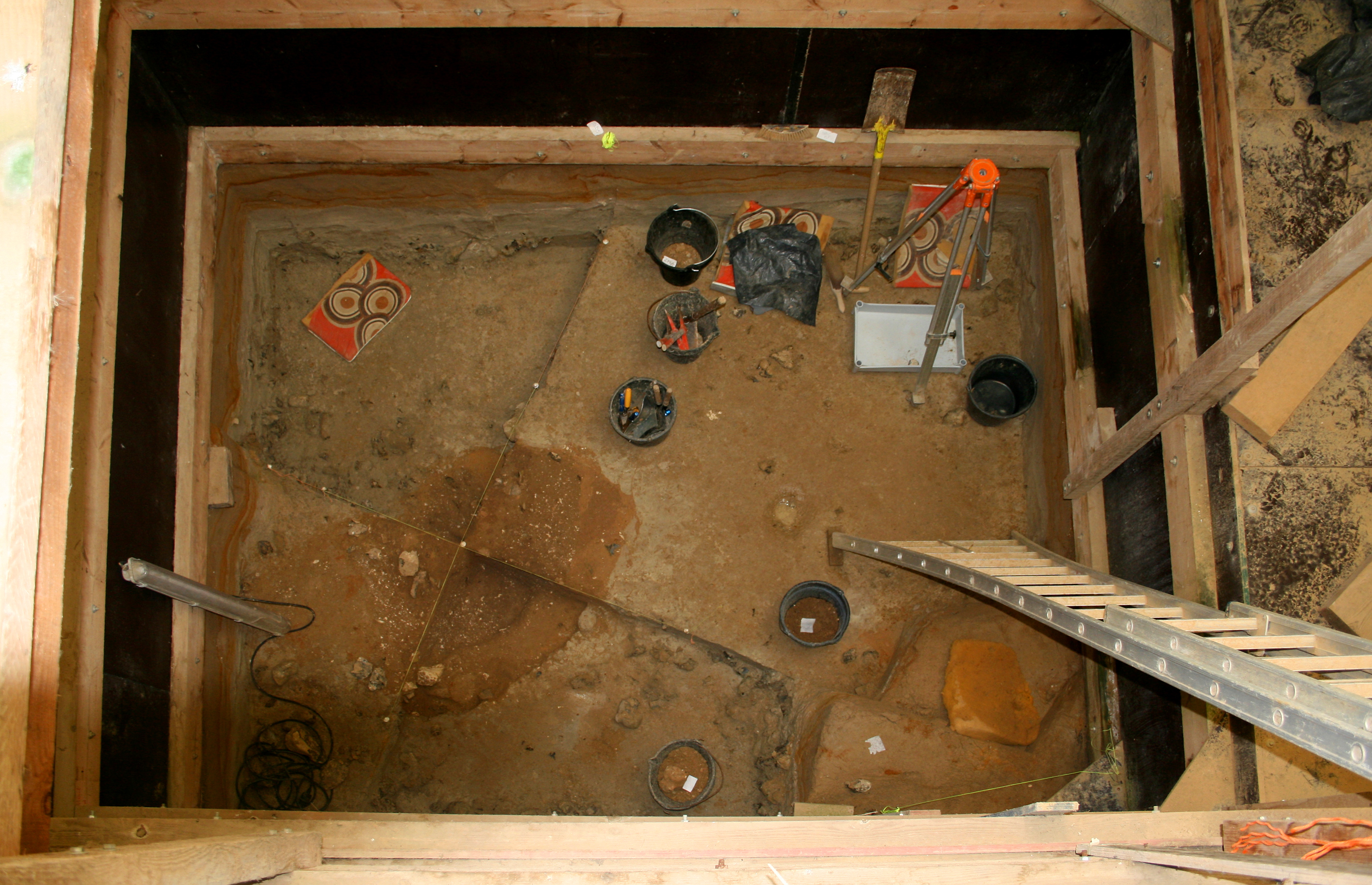
Excavations in Champ à Cailloux

== Conservation and access ==
An interpretative centre called SILEX'S opened in spring 2015. There is a museum on the surface and it is normally possible to descend into a mine.

== Similar sites ==
The site has been compared with Grimes Graves and Cissbury in the United Kingdom, and Krzemionki in Poland, which are also sources of flint stone. However, different hard rocks were used for the polished stone axes. There are several locations in Britain where fine-grained igneous or metamorphic rock was collected from screes or opencast mines, then roughed out locally before trading on to other parts of the country. Examples include the Langdale axe industry, Penmaenmawr and Tievebulliagh.

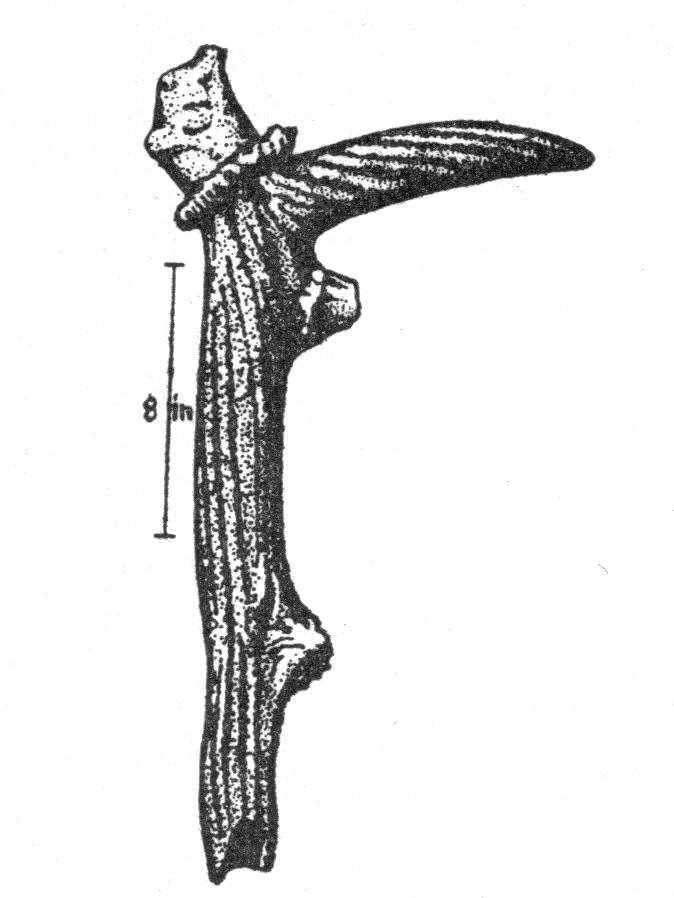
Deer antler pick (Grimes Graves)

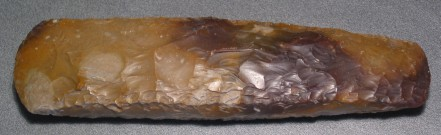
Late Stone Age flint axe, about 31 cm long
