= Grime's Graves =

Neolithic flint mines in Norfolk, England

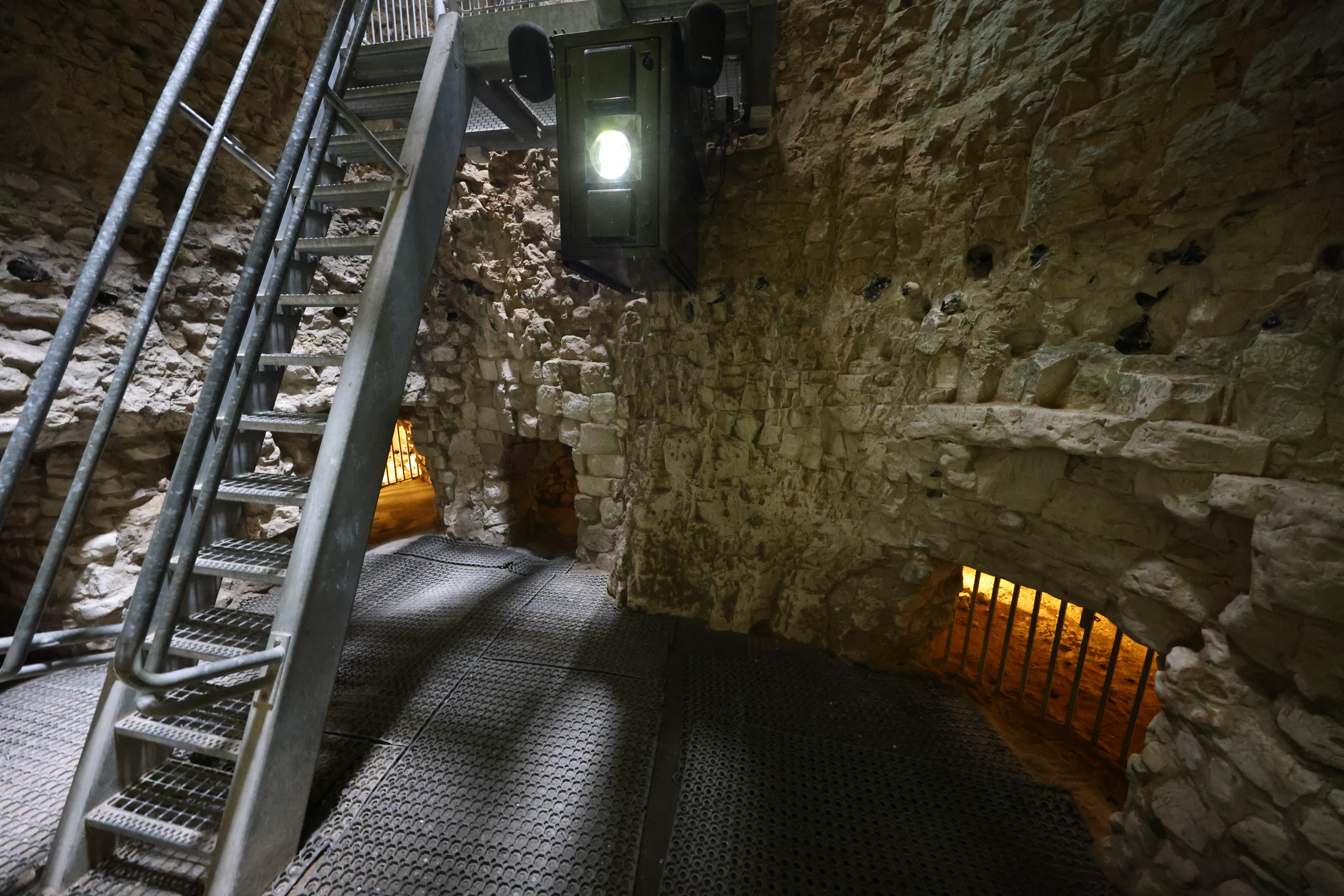
- Interior view of the public pit at Grime's Graves

- Location within England
- Location: Lynford, Norfolk, England; 52°28′33″N 0°40′31″E
- Products: Flint tools
- Opened: c. 2600 BC
- Closed: c. 2300 BC
- Company: Managed by English Heritage

Grime's Graves is a large Neolithic flint mining complex in Norfolk, England. It lies 8 km (5 mi) north east from Brandon, Suffolk in the East of England. It was worked between c. 2600 and c. 2300 BC, although production may have continued through the Bronze and Iron Ages and later, owing to the low cost of flint compared with metals. Flint was much in demand for making polished stone axes in the Neolithic period. Much later, when flint had been replaced by metal tools, flint nodules were in demand for other uses, such as for building and as strikers for muskets.

Grime's Graves was first extensively explored by the 19th-century archaeologist William Greenwell.

The scheduled monument extends over an area of some 37 ha (91 acres) and consists of at least 433 shafts dug into the natural chalk to reach seams of flint. The largest shafts are more than 14 m (46 ft) deep and 12 m (39 ft) in diameter at the surface. It has been calculated that more than 2,000 tonnes of chalk had to be removed from the larger shafts, taking 20 men around five months, before stone of sufficient quality was reached. An upper 'topstone' and middle 'wallstone' seam of flint was dug through on the way to the deeper third 'floorstone' seam which most interested the miners. The site is managed by English Heritage and can be visited.

The site is also a biological and geological Site of Special Scientific Interest and a Geological Conservation Review site. It is part of the Breckland Special Area of Conservation and Special Protection Area.

== Mining method ==
Plan of old shaft and galleries

In order to remove the chalk efficiently, the ancient miners built wooden platforms and ladders as they dug downwards and piled the spoil around the shaft opening using turf revetments to hold it in place for the season, after which the shaft and all its galleries were thoroughly and fastidiously backfilled to promote stability. The landscape around Grime's Graves has a characteristic pockmarked appearance caused by the infilled shafts. This is probably what inspired the later Anglo-Saxon inhabitants of the area to name it after their god Grim (literally the masked, or hooded one, a euphemism for Woden). Although the pagan Anglo-Saxons seem to have had some idea of what the site was, as the name of the site means literally "the masked one's quarries" (or Grim's Graben), it was not until Canon William Greenwell excavated one of the shafts in 1868–1870 that their purpose was discovered in modern times. Similar sites have been found elsewhere in Europe, such as Cissbury in West Sussex, Krzemionki in Poland, and Spiennes in Belgium.

=== Tools ===
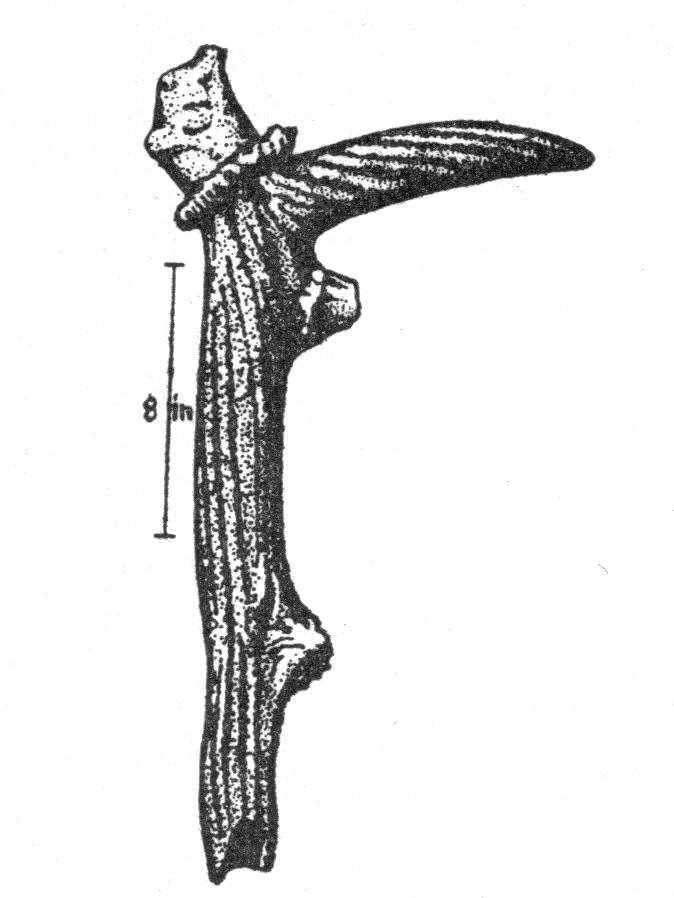
Deer antler pick

The miners used picks fashioned from the antler of red deer. They probably used wooden shovels, although this is only inferred by analogy with other flint mines with better conditions for the preservation of artefacts. Analysis of the antlers has shown that the miners were mainly right-handed and favoured the left antlers out of those that were naturally shed seasonally by the deer. The 28 pits excavated up to 2008 yielded an average of 142.5 antler picks each, of which an average of 14.8 have been found to be left-handed.

Once they had reached the floorstone flint, the miners dug lateral galleries outwards from the bottom, following the flint seam. The medium-depth shafts yielded as much as 60 tons of flint nodules, which were brought to the surface and roughly worked into shape on site. The blank tools were then possibly traded elsewhere for final polishing. It is estimated that 60 tons of flint could have produced as many as 10,000 of the polished stone axes, which were the mines' main product. Extrapolation across the site suggests that Grime's Graves may have produced around 16–18,000 tonnes of flint across the 433 shafts recorded to date. However, there are large areas of the site covered by later activity which are believed to conceal many more mineshafts.

There were other hard stones used for axe manufacture, those of the Langdale axe industry and Penmaenmawr in North Wales being traded across Europe, as well as other less well-known igneous and metamorphic rocks. The axes were much in demand for forest clearance and settlement, development of farmland for arable crops and raising animals, which characterises the Neolithic period.

=== Customs and beliefs ===
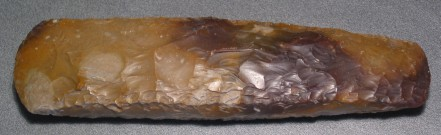
Neolithic flint axe, measuring about 31 cm × 8 cm (12.2 in × 3.1 in)

One unproductive shaft (pit 15) appears to have been turned into a shrine. An altar of flint lumps had been built with a chalk bowl at its base and antler picks piled around. In front of the altar had been placed a Venus figurine of chalk, a chalk phallus and some balls, also of chalk. It may have been an attempt to ensure that the mine remained productive or 'fertile' after this particular shaft turned out to have little flint in it. However, it is possible that the Venus figurine and the phallus are modern fakes – there is a lack of primary evidence surrounding their recovery in 1939, and rumours circulated at the time of the excavation that they were planted in order to deceive Leslie Armstrong, the archaeologist overseeing the dig.

=== Neolithic infrastructure ===
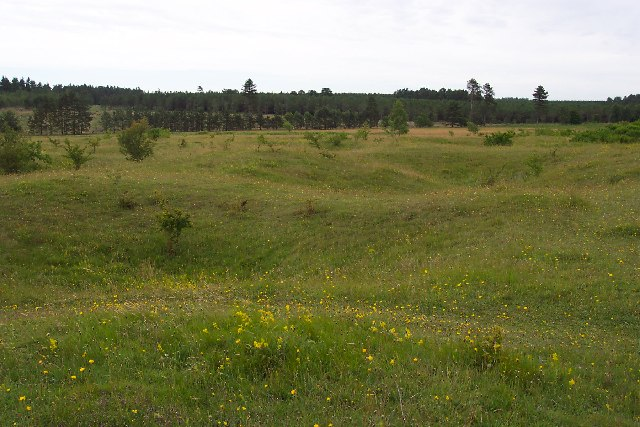
The remains of mineshafts, pits, and spoil heaps pockmark the surface of Grime's Graves

Such a large industry may have required supporting infrastructure. Assuming no more than two shafts were open at any one time, around 120 red deer may have needed to be bred and managed nearby, in order to provide a steady supply of antler as well as skin, food and other products that the miners would require. Alternatively, the mines may have been worked intermittently by local farmers, as happened in many early metal mines during the Bronze Age and the later Iron Age.

Earlier flint mines in Britain, such as Cissbury in West Sussex, were just as important as Grime's Graves, and there were many very local sources of flint which were exploited on the downlands. However, it is probably relevant that Grime's Graves were close to the very rich soils of the Fens, and forest clearance here would rely on local products.

There was also extensive farming settlement during the Bronze Age, known from middens that infill the mouths of many Neolithic mineshafts. Animal bones from these middens show that the Bronze Age people kept cattle, which they milked, sheep and a few pigs. They also grew barley, wheat and peas.

Underground in Grimes Graves

== Modern history ==
Grime's Graves was first extensively explored by the archaeologist William Greenwell in 1868. The function of the holes in the ground around it was not known in the time between the mine's abandonment and his exploration of it. An 18th-century priest suggested that the holes were left by Vikings, and an amateur archeologist suggested a century later that they were the remains of a fortress of the Celts.

=== The site today ===
Grime's Graves is in the care of English Heritage. It is open to the public and it is possible to descend a 9 m (30 ft) ladder and explore one of the shafts. There is a small exhibition area. This is the only shaft of its kind open to the public in England.

==== Publications ====
The full English Heritage reports on the excavations at Grime's Graves in 1971–72 are now available online through the Archaeology Data Service. Doctor Philip Harding FSA, later to appear in the TV programme Time Team, dug the site each summer from 1972 to 1976.

== Images ==
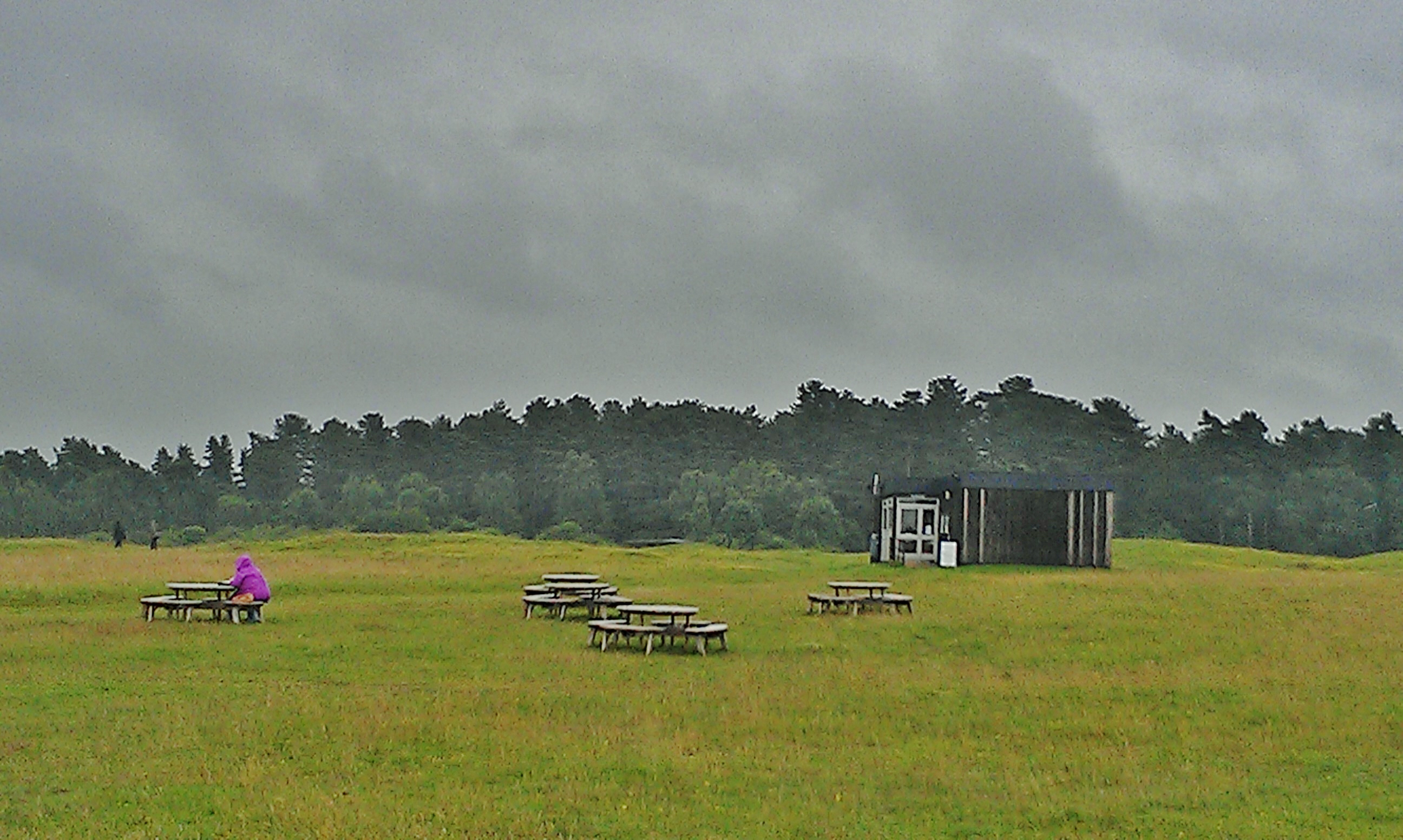
The visitor's hut and picnic tables.

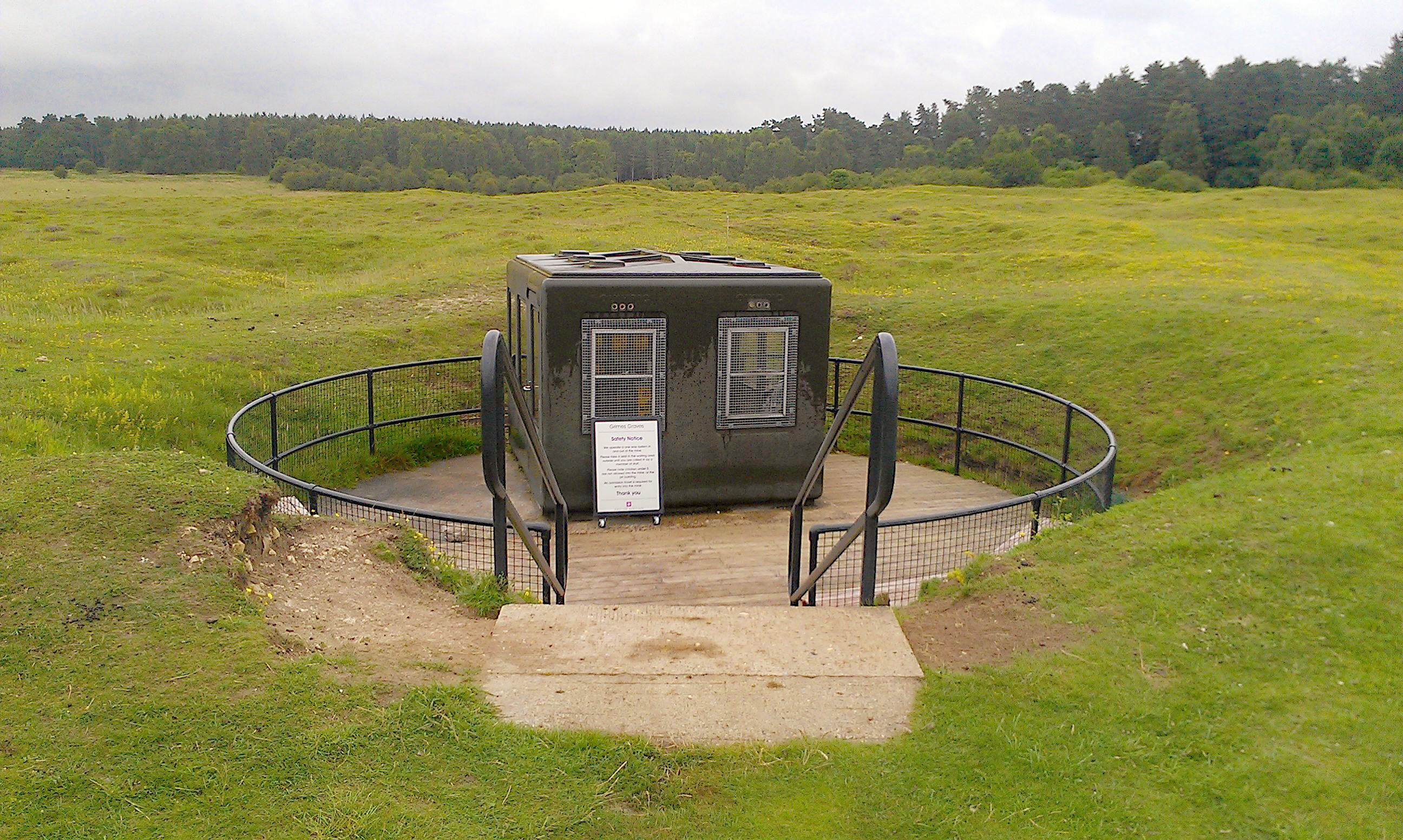
The previous entrance to Pit I at Grime's Graves, the only flint mine open to the public.

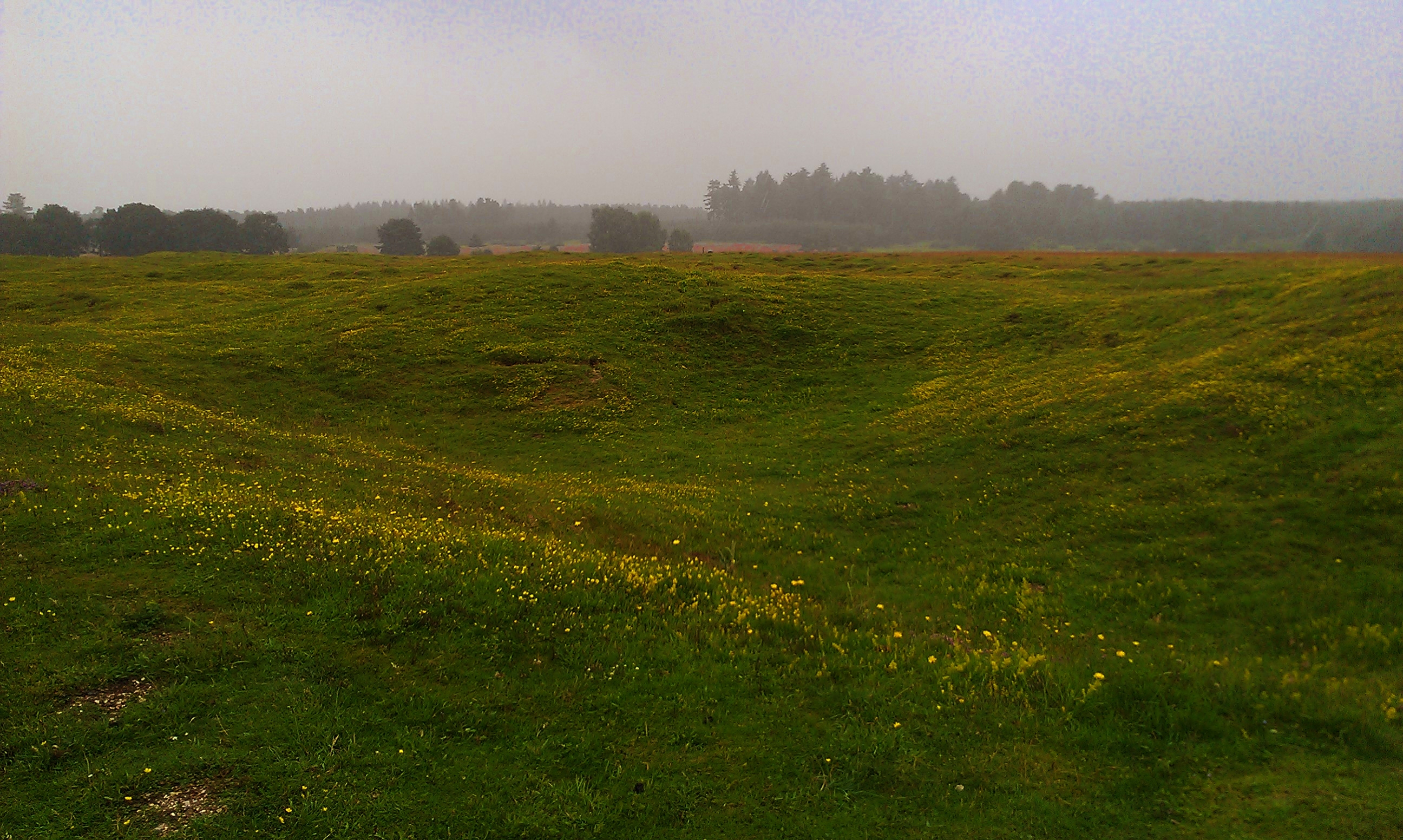
One of the many pits at Grime's Graves.

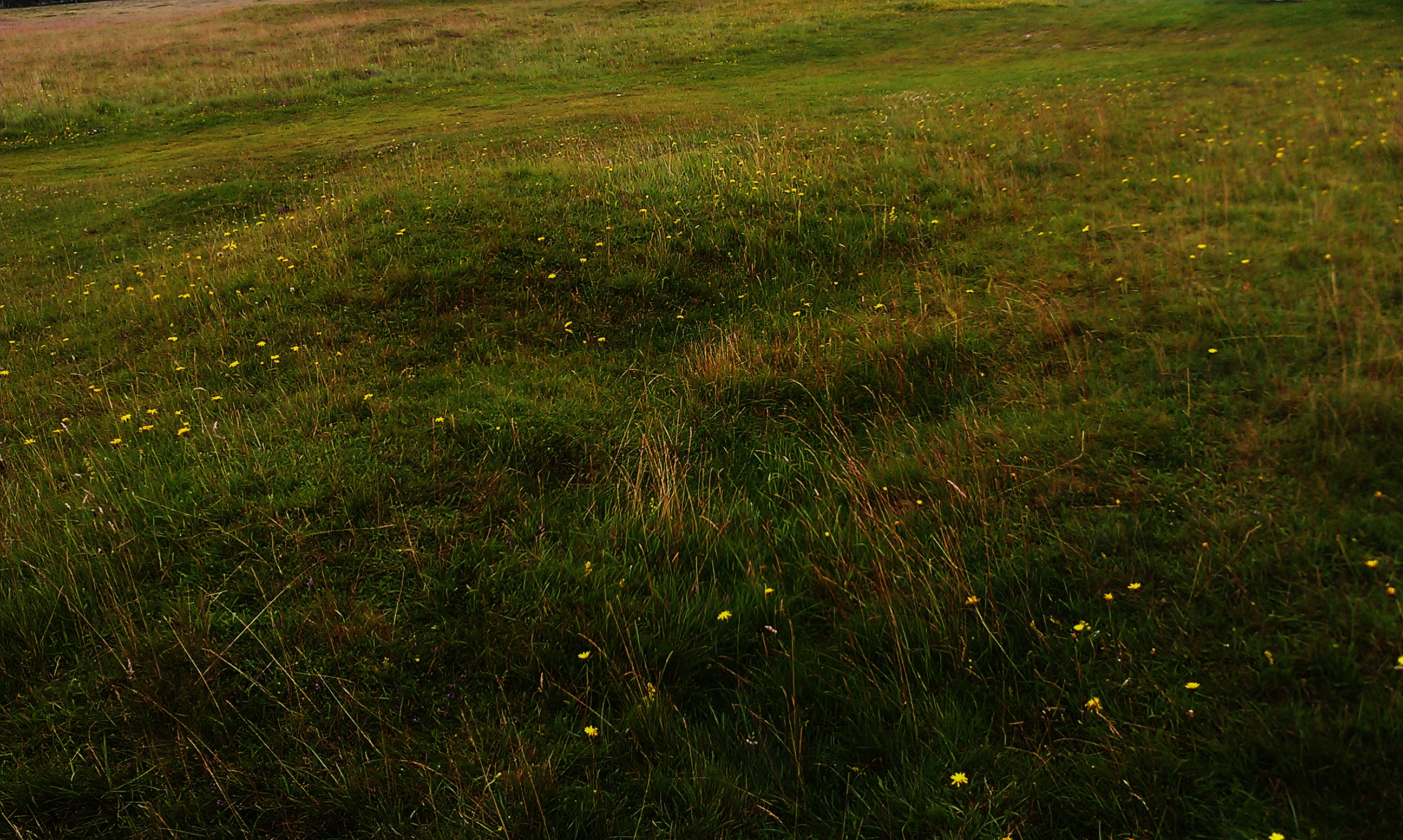
One of two Second World War foxholes at Grime's Graves, located between the car park and visitor's centre.

Multimedia exhibit at the visitor's centre.

== See also ==
- Knapping
- Krzemionki
- Spiennes

== Bibliography ==
- Russell, M., (2000) Flint Mines in Neolithic Britain. Tempus. Stroud, ISBN 075241481X
- Russell, M., (2002) Monuments of the British Neolithic: The Roots of Architecture. Tempus. Stroud, ISBN 0752419536
- Barber, M., Field D., Topping, P, (1999)The Neolithic Flint Mines of England, Royal Commission on the Historical Monuments of England / English Heritage, ISBN 1-873592-41-8
- Piggott, S., (1986) 'Early British craftsmen' Antiquity LX No 230, Pages 189-192.
- Clutton-Brock, J. (1984). Excavations at Grime's Graves Norfolk 1972-1976 Fascicule 1: Neolithic Antler Picks From Grime's Graves, Norfolk, And Durrington Walls, Wiltshire: A Biometrical Analysis. British Museum Press. ISBN 0-7141-1374-3.
- Longworth, I., Herne, A., Varndell, G. and Needham, S., (1991) Excavations at Grimes Graves Norfolk 1972-1976 Fascicule 3: Shaft X: Bronze Age Flint, Chalk and Metalworking, British Museum Press, ISBN 0-7141-1396-4
- Legge, A. J. (1991) Excavations at Grime's Graves Norfolk 1972-1976 Fascicule 4: Animals, Environment and the Bronze Age Economy. London, British Museum Press, ISBN 0-7141-1399-9
