= Chapelle-lez-Herlaimont =

Municipality in Hainaut Province, Wallonia, Belgium

Chapelle-lez-Herlaimont El Tchapele (Walloon)
- Municipality
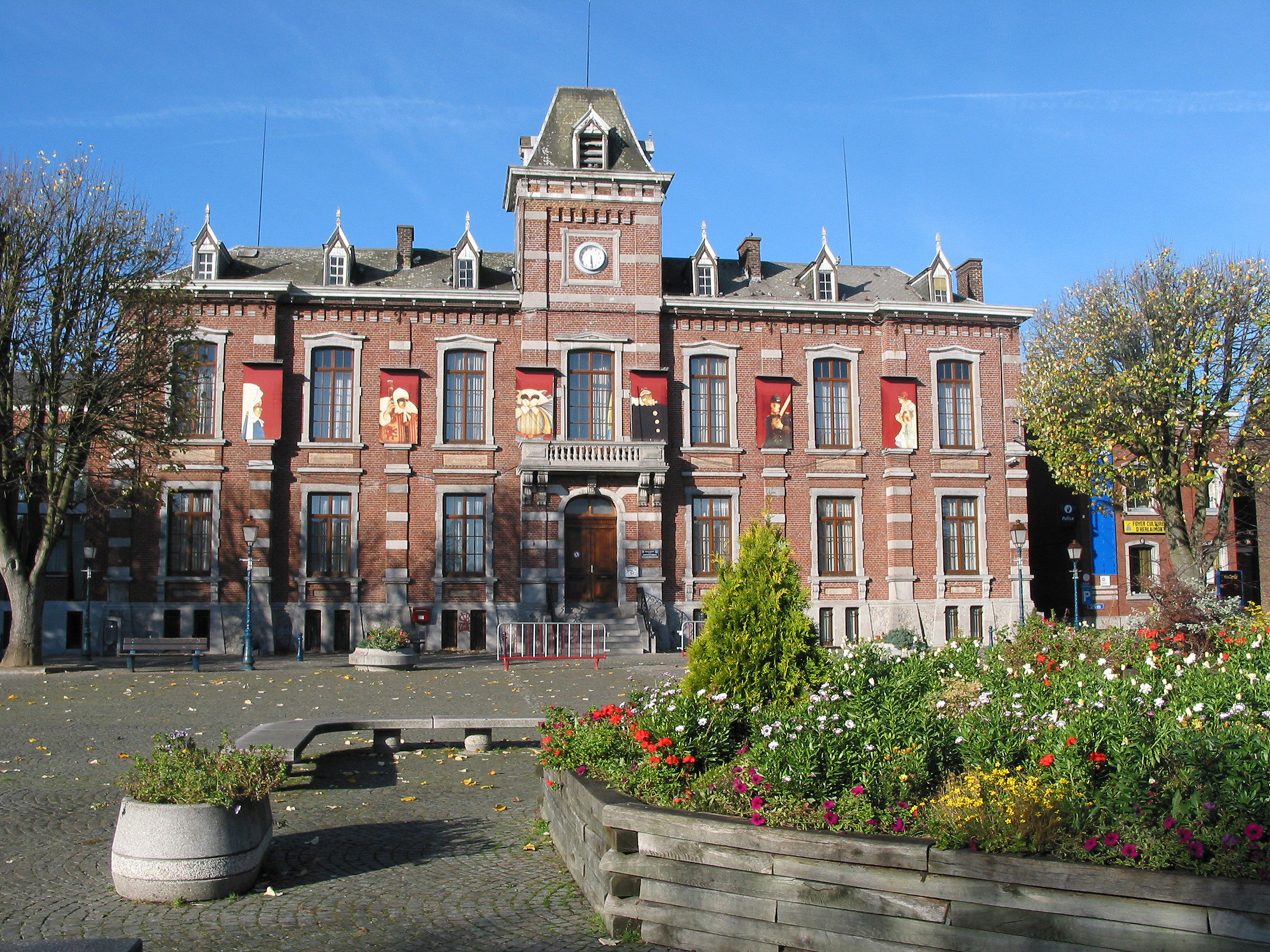

- Flag Coat of arms

- Location of Chapelle-lez-Herlaimont in Hainaut
- Interactive map of Chapelle-lez-Herlaimont
- Location in Belgium
- Coordinates: 50°28′N 04°17′E
- Country: Belgium
- Community: French Community
- Region: Wallonia
- Province: Hainaut
- Arrondissement: Charleroi

Government
  - Mayor: Karl De Vos (PS)
  - Governing party: PS

Area
  - Total: 18.21 km^{2} (7.03 sq mi)

Population (2018-01-01)
  - Total: 14,900
  - Density: 818/km^{2} (2,120/sq mi)
- Postal codes: 7160
- NIS code: 52010
- Area codes: 064
- Website: www.chapelle-lez-herlaimont.be

Chapelle-lez-Herlaimont (French pronunciation: [ʃapɛl le ɛʁlɛmɔ̃]; Walloon: El Tchapele) is a municipality of Wallonia located in the province of Hainaut, Belgium.

On January 1, 2018, Chapelle-lez-Herlaimont had a total population of 14,900. The total area is 18.10 km^{2} which gives a population density of 820 inhabitants per km^{2}.

The municipality consists of the following districts: Chapelle-lez-Herlaimont, Godarville, and Piéton.

== Famous inhabitants ==
- Alphonse Briart, geologist
