= Spiennes =

Sub-municipality of the city of Mons, Belgium

Spiennes Spiene (Walloon)
- Sub-municipality of Mons
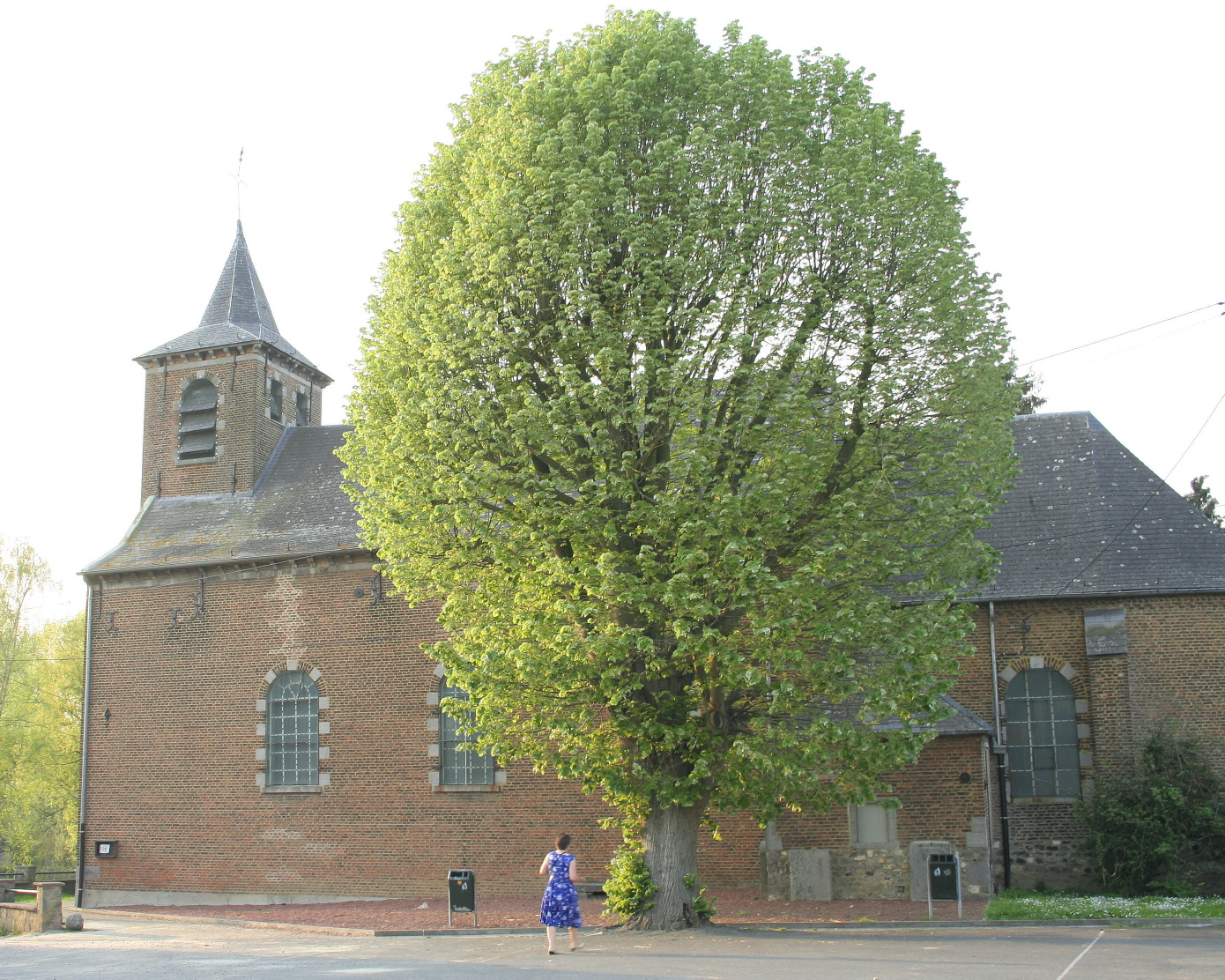
- Saint-Amand Church

- Location of Spiennes in Mons
- Interactive map of Spiennes
- Location within Belgium Location within Hainaut (Belgium)
- Coordinates: 50°25′09″N 3°56′38″E
- Country: Belgium
- Community: French Community
- Region: Wallonia
- Province: Hainaut
- Arrondissement: Mons
- Municipality: Mons

Area
  - Total: 5.370 km^{2} (2.073 sq mi)

Population (2024-01-01)
  - Total: 976
  - Density: 182/km^{2} (471/sq mi)
- Postal codes: 7032
- Area codes: 065

Spiennes (French pronunciation: [spjɛn]; Walloon: Spiene) is a sub-municipality of the city of Mons located in the province of Hainaut, Wallonia, Belgium. It was a separate municipality until 1977. On 1 January 1977, it was merged into Mons.

== Heritage ==
The locality is well known for its neolithic flint mines, which are on the list of UNESCO World Heritage Sites since 2000.
