= Blackpatch =

Archaeological site in West Sussex, England

- Location within West Sussex
- 50°52′6″N 0°26′48″W
- Periods: Neolithic; Bronze Age
- Location: near Findon, West Sussex
- OS grid reference: TQ 094 088

Scheduled monument
- Designated: 23 February 1933
- Reference no.: 1015880

Blackpatch is an archaeological site in West Sussex, England, about 2 miles (3.2 km) west of the village of Findon and about 3 miles (4.8 km) north-west of Worthing.

It is the site of a Neolithic flint mine, and Bronze Age barrows. The site is a scheduled monument.

== Description ==
=== Flint mine ===
The flint mine, which was levelled about 1950, is on the south-west slope of Blackpatch Hill. There are more than 64 infilled shafts, diameter up to 6 metres (20 ft).

The shafts and other features at the site were investigated from 1922 to 1932 by John Pull. Seven shafts were excavated. They were up to 3 metres (9.8 ft) deep; from them, galleries extended up to 8.5 metres (28 ft), following a single seam of flint. Flint flakes and pottery sherds were found in the infills from the shafts. Around the shafts were working areas where mined flint was processed. An antler pick from a shaft has been radiocarbon dated to about 3000 BC.

Pull later investigated the flint mines in West Sussex at Church Hill and at Cissbury.

=== Barrows ===
The site, now levelled, contained more than 12 round barrows, dating from the Bronze Age. Three of them were over infilled flint mine shafts, with others to the north-east.
