= Striped flint =

Decorative variety of flint rock

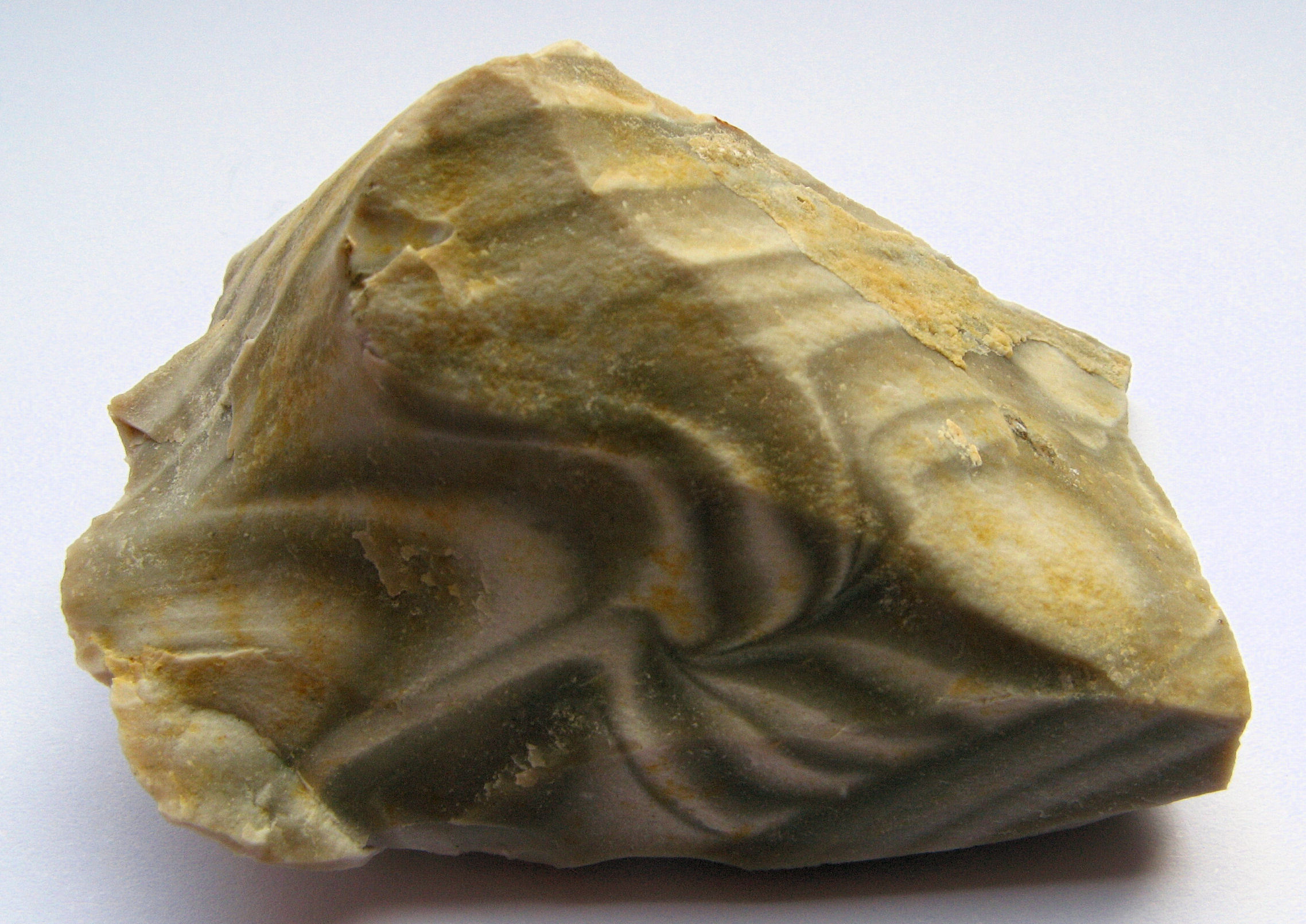
Striped flint

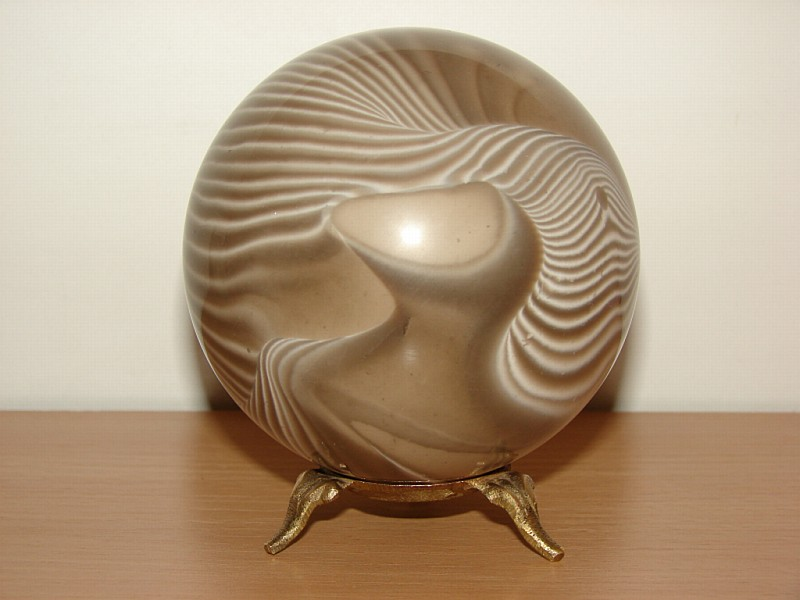
A ball of striped flint

Striped flint (sometimes called banded flint) is a version of flint, with a more or less regular system of concentric dark and pale stripes, noted to resemble rolling waters.

== Use ==
A large striped flint deposit is located in Lesser Poland, near the cities of Sandomierz, Ostrowiec Świętokrzyski and Iłża. Because of its rarity and distinctive look, local striped flint is in use today in jewellery and has become a regional export product.

Striped flint was mined by Neolithic people near Krzemionki Opatowskie village around 4,000 BC, and it was used in manufacturing of axes.

== Geology ==
Upper Jurassic (Oxfordian) striped flint from Lesser Poland consists mainly of α-quartz. Morphology of grains indicates that the quartz is not a product of opal and chalcedony conversion, but it precipitated directly from the seawater. The crystallinity is higher in the centre of a concretion. Sometimes chalcedony is present, being a product of recrystalization of opal. Other minerals can be found in small quantities: clay minerals, iron oxides and hydroxides, calcite, feldspar, mica, glauconite, zircon, tourmaline and rutile.

Different colouring of individual bands is linked to an increased and decreased number and size of pores that brought about different light reflection. Fewer and smaller pores reflect less light.
