= Harrow Hill, West Sussex =

Archeological site in West Sussex, England

Harrow Hill
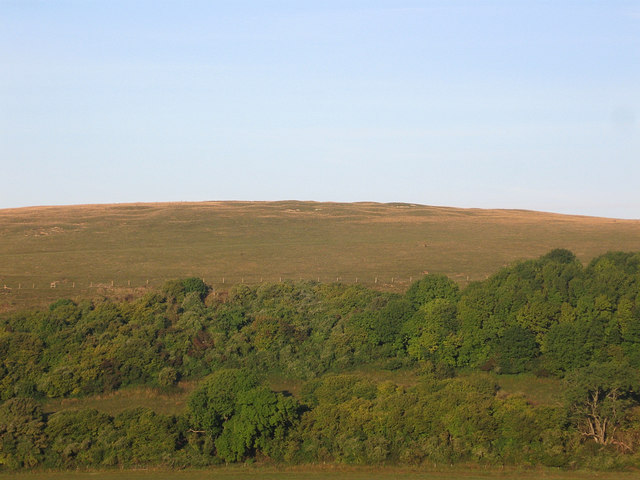
- The earthworks on the crown of the hill

- Location within West Sussex
- 50°52′44″N 0°27′49″W
- Periods: Neolithic; Bronze Age
- Location: near Angmering, West Sussex
- OS grid reference: TQ 082 100

Scheduled monument
- Designated: 22 February 1933
- Reference no.: 1015239

Harrow Hill is an archaeological site in West Sussex, England. It is on the South Downs about 3 miles (5 km) north of the village of Angmering and 5 miles (8 km) north-west of Worthing.

There is a Neolithic flint mine, and a Martin Down style enclosure from the Bronze Age. The site is a scheduled monument.

== Description ==
=== Flint mine ===
The flint mine is on the crown of the hill, occupying about 8 hectares (20 acres), there are about 245 mine shafts and pits. The shafts survive as circular hollows of diameter up to 19.5 metres (64 ft) and depth 1.8 metres (5 ft 11 in); there are spoil heaps of height up to 1 metre (3 ft 3 in). The southern part of the area, where there is hummocky ground, is thought to show a slightly different period of mining.

A shaft was excavated in 1924–25: its width was 6.1 metres (20 ft) and it was found to be 6.7 metres (22 ft) deep. There had been some exploitation of upper levels of flint, and there were six radiating galleries at the bottom of the pit. Some galleries had engraved designs above the entrances, which may have been miners' tallies. An antler pick from a shaft has been radio-carbon dated to about 3710 BC.

Flint was mined probably for trading elsewhere. The flint mine at Cissbury, about 3.7 miles (6.0 km) to the south-east, dates from about the same time. There are also flint mines near Harrow Hill, at Church Hill, about 2.2 miles (3.5 km) south-east, and at Blackpatch, about 1.0 mile (1.6 km) south-east.

=== Martin Down style enclosure ===
The Martin Down style enclosure, interpreted as a domestic settlement, is named after the Bronze Age enclosure on Martin Down in Hampshire. It is a rectangle aligned west–east, and at the north-east corner it partly overlies mine shafts on the southern side of the mining area. There is a bank up to 6 metres (20 ft) wide and 0.6 metres (2 ft 0 in) high, with an external ditch, enclosing an area of about 0.3 hectares (0.7 acres); there is an entrance on the west side.

It was partly excavated in 1936. Pottery sherds from about 600 BC were found, and skulls of 50 to 100 oxen. There was once a timber gateway at the entrance, and the bank had a timber palisade.
