= Mesvin =

Sub-municipality of the city of Mons, Belgium

Mesvin Mevin (Walloon)
- Sub-municipality of Mons
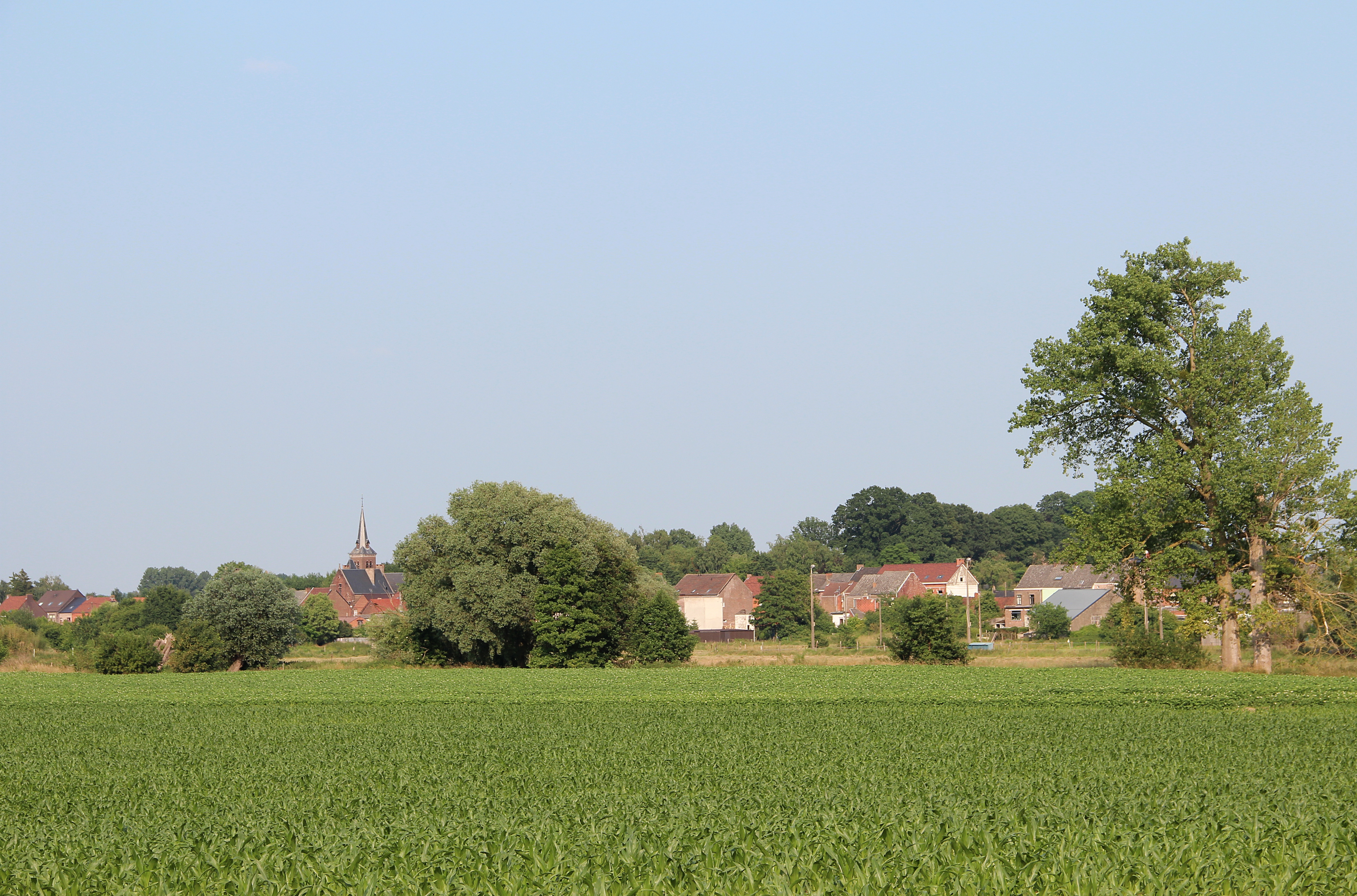
- The village

- Coat of arms

- Location of Mesvin in Mons
- Interactive map of Mesvin
- Location within Belgium Location within Hainaut (Belgium)
- Coordinates: 50°25′42″N 3°57′38″E
- Country: Belgium
- Community: French Community
- Region: Wallonia
- Province: Hainaut
- Arrondissement: Mons
- Municipality: Mons

Area
  - Total: 2.25 km^{2} (0.87 sq mi)

Population (2020-01-01)
  - Total: 952
  - Density: 423/km^{2} (1,100/sq mi)
- Postal codes: 7022
- Area codes: 065

Mesvin (French pronunciation: [mevɛ̃]; Walloon: Mevin) is a sub-municipality of the city of Mons located in the province of Hainaut, Wallonia, Belgium. It was a separate municipality until 1977. On 1 January 1977, it was merged into Mons.
