= Krzemionki =

Krzemionki Prehistoric Striped Flint Mining Region
UNESCO World Heritage Site
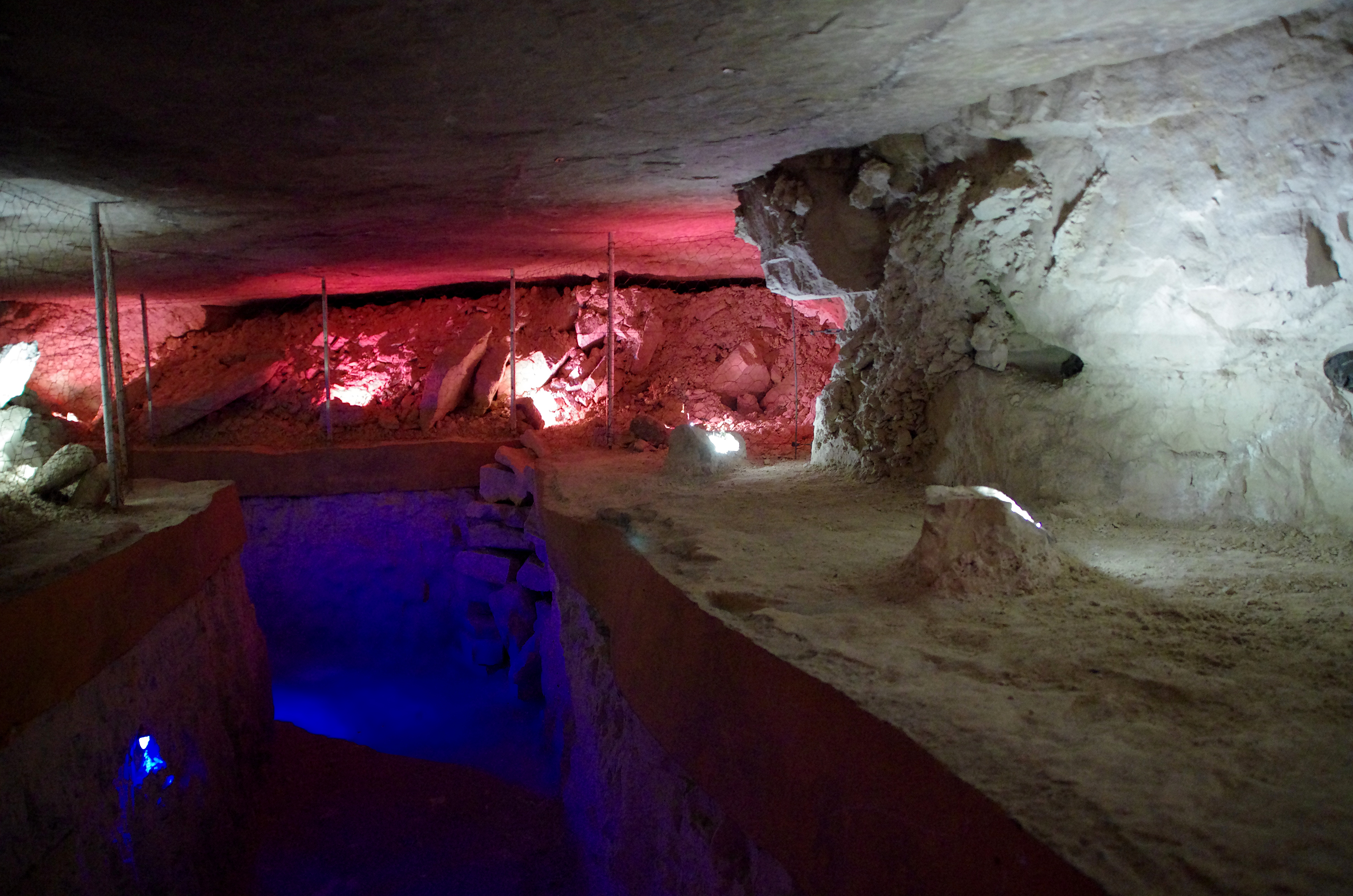
- Archaeological Reserve in Krzemionki

- Location within Poland Location within Świętokrzyskie Voivodeship
- Location: Poland
- Criteria: Cultural: (iii), (iv)
- Reference: 1599
- Inscription: 2019 (43rd Session)
- Area: 342.2 ha (846 acres)
- Buffer zone: 1,828.7 ha (4,519 acres)
- Coordinates: 50°58′4.7″N 21°30′8.3″E

Krzemionki, also Krzemionki Opatowskie ([kʂɛˈmʲjɔnkʲi ɔpaˈtɔfskʲɛ], "Opatów silica-mine"), is a Neolithic and early Bronze Age complex of flint mines for the extraction of Upper Jurassic (Oxfordian) banded flints located about eight kilometers north-east of the Polish city of Ostrowiec Świętokrzyski. It is one of the largest known complexes of prehistoric flint mines in Europe together with Grime's Graves in England and Spiennes in Belgium.

The flint mining in Krzemionki began about 3900 BC and lasted until about 1600 BC. During Neolithic times the mine was used by members of the Funnelbeaker culture who spread the flint mining products (mostly flint axeheads) far up to 300 km. The Globular Amphora Culture also used the pits and even more intensely, enlarging the area of axehead distribution to about 500 km.

The site is a Polish historic monument, as designated on 16 October 1994. Its listing is maintained by the National Heritage Board of Poland. On 6 July 2019, the Krzemionki Prehistoric Striped Flint Mining Region was inscribed as a UNESCO World Heritage Site.

== History of mining ==
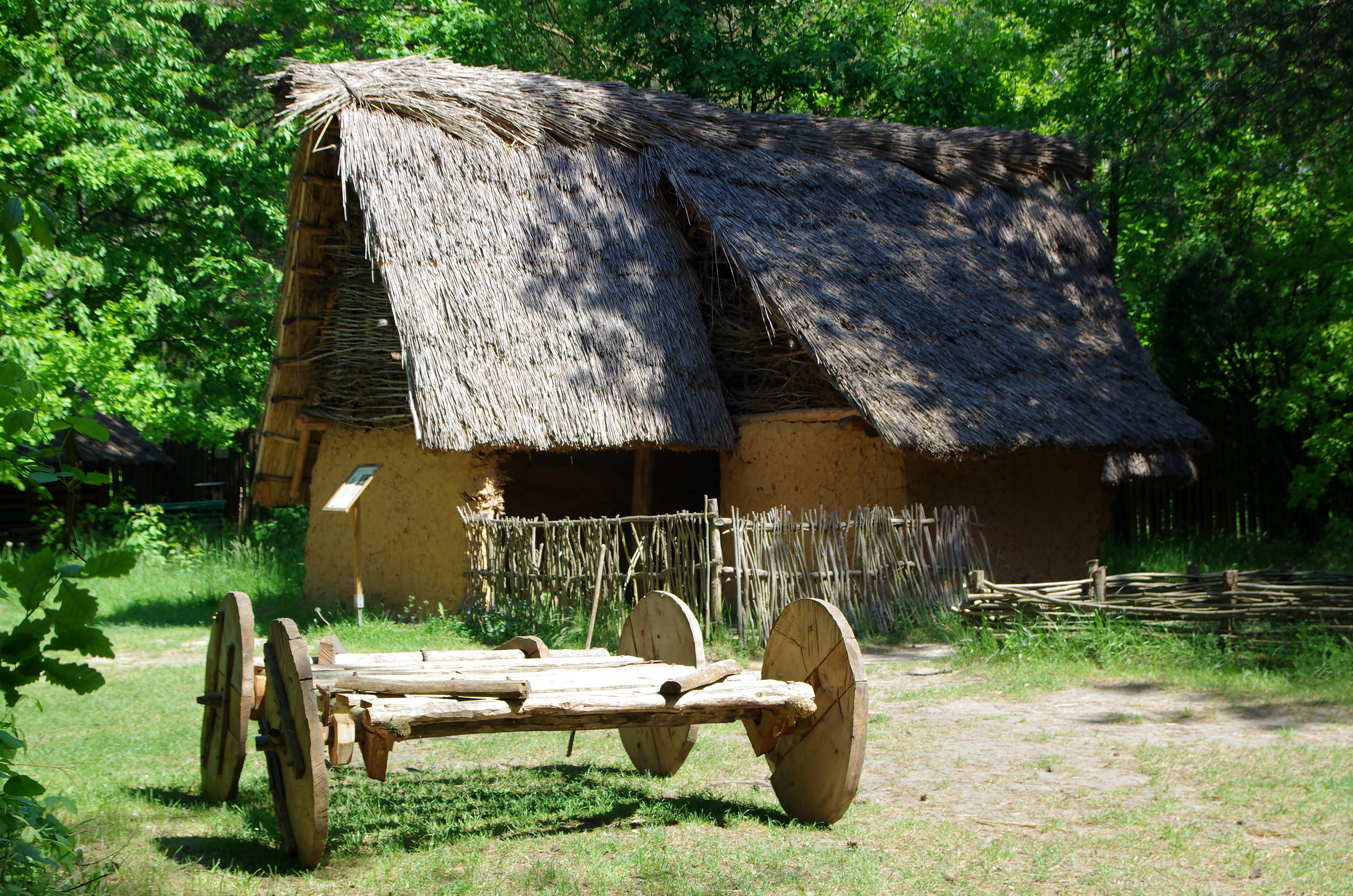
A reconstructed Neolithic settlement above the mine

The mining area is 4.5 km long and 25–180 m wide, covering an area of 78.5 ha. There are more than 4000 mine shafts known with depths of 9 meters deep with access shafts measuring from four to twelve meter in diameter. Some of the shafts are connected by short horizontal passage for the purposes of access or drainage called adits. They are 55 – 120 cm in height covering an area of about 4.5 km. Rare Neolithic pictures are engraved on the walls of some of these addits.

The flint at Krzemionki was exploited from the 4th millennium through the middle of the 2nd millennium BCE (3000-1600 BCE.) by people of the Funnelbeaker culture, Globular Amphora and Mierzanowice cultures who excavated flint mainly by hatchets. Banded flints from Krzemionki were used mainly for the manufacture of axes and chisels. Abundant quantities of these tools were traded as far away as 660 km from the Krzemionki mines. On basis of this flint, the eastern Globular Amphorae group is clearly separated from the western group (central Germany), where no flint, but special battle axes appear. The main period of the mines' exploitation was 2500-2000 BCE. Flint mining at Krzemionki began to decline beginning in 1800-1600 BCE.

In following centuries, the Krzemionki mining district was only sporadically visited. The village near the mines was mentioned first historically in 1509 and was owned by a man named Jakub from Szydłowiec. The area's numerous small limestone quarries were used for lime production during the first half of the 20th century.

== History of scientific investigations and tourism ==
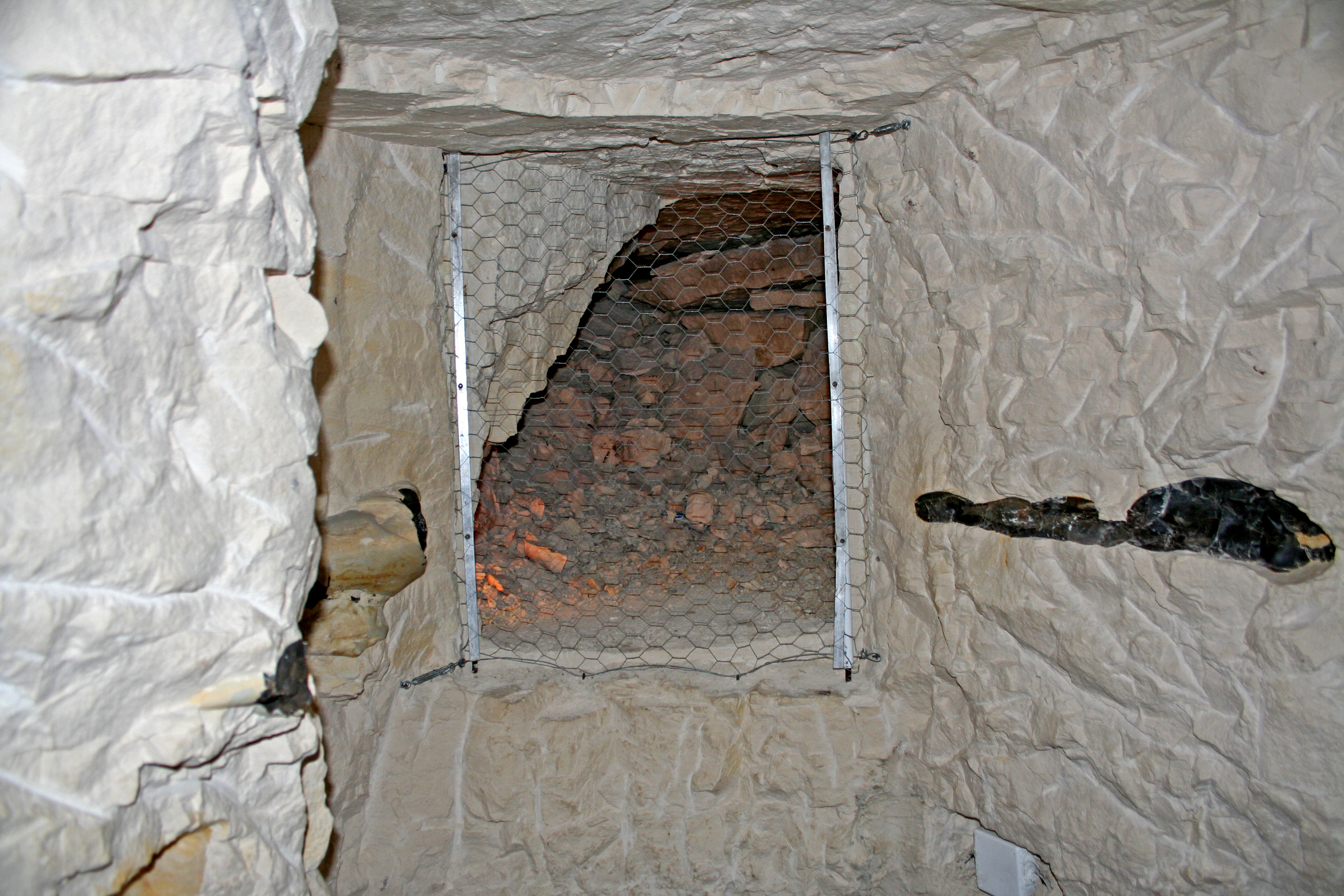
Neolithic adit (horizontal passage) in the Krzemionki mine complex

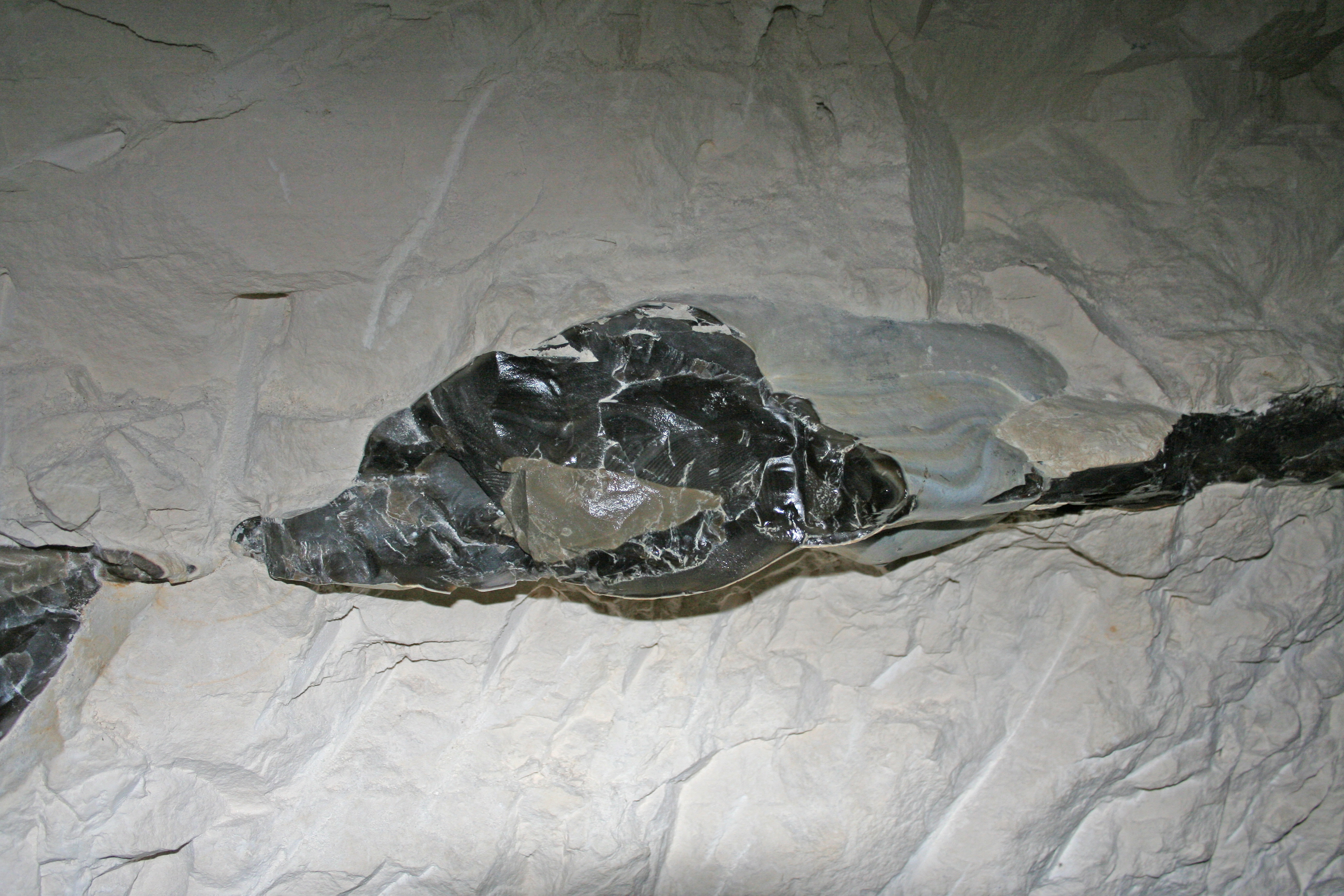
Banded flint nodule in the wall of an adit in the Krzemionki mine complex

The mines were discovered in 1922 by geologist Jan Samsonowicz. Archaeological investigations headed by archaeologist Stefan Krukowski began in 1923. After the Second World War, the head of the scientific team was Tadeusz Żurowski who explored the mines in Krzemionki, especially in 1958 - 1961. In 1967, the Krzemionki mines were designated an archaeological reserve and, in 1995, a natural reserve.

Small groups of tourists have visited the Krzemionki mines since the late 1950s. The mines were opened to large-scale tourism on 11 June 1985 (so-called Tourist Route No. 1). On 10 June 1990 a second underground tourist route was opened and an open-air archaeological museum was dedicated in 1992. The underground tourist route is 465 m long and is 11.5 m deep at its deepest point.

== See also ==
- Grime's Graves
- Spiennes
- List of World Heritage Sites of Poland
