= Worthing Museum and Art Gallery =

Museum in Worthing, England

Coordinates: 50°48′52.46″N 0°22′18.39″W

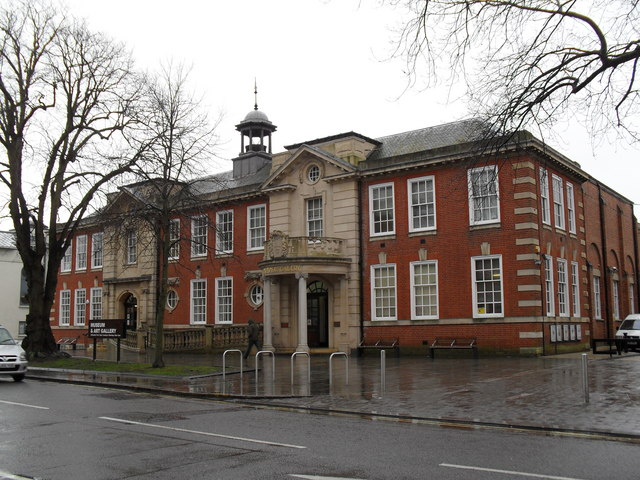
- Established: 1908
- Location: Chapel Road, Worthing, West Sussex, England
- Public transit access: Worthing railway station
- Website: worthingmuseum.co.uk
- Area: 588,000 sq ft (54,600 m^{2}) in 94 Galleries

Worthing Museum and Art Gallery is in the centre of Worthing near the grade II* listed St Paul's. The building, which celebrated its centenary in 2008, was originally designed to house the town's library as well as the museum, the library section being funded by Andrew Carnegie. It is the largest museum in West Sussex.

== Collections and displays ==
Worthing Museum and Art Gallery has one of the largest costume and textile collections in the UK. The 19th century and 20th century galleries display just a tiny fraction of the museum's contents. The current display in the 19th century gallery looks at the changing shape of women during the century. The 20th century gallery concentrates on women's fashions including pictures of local residents through the ages. There is also a small menswear display.

The museum also holds records for all archaeological finds between the rivers Adur and Arun. This includes the John Pull Collection of Neolithic flint mines, shown on the television series Time Team, the Patching hoard of gold coins, an Anglo-Saxon long boat, and the Highdown Goblet – an Ancient Egyptian glass vase with an Ancient Greek inscription, found at the Anglo-Saxon cemetery at Highdown.

The museum has over 900 dolls and a collection of toys from the Georgian period to the present day, in its Juvenilia collection, along with the Colin Mears Collection – 2000 objects documenting the history of 20th Century Childhood. It also has social history, numismatics, and fine and decorative art collections.

== Art collection ==
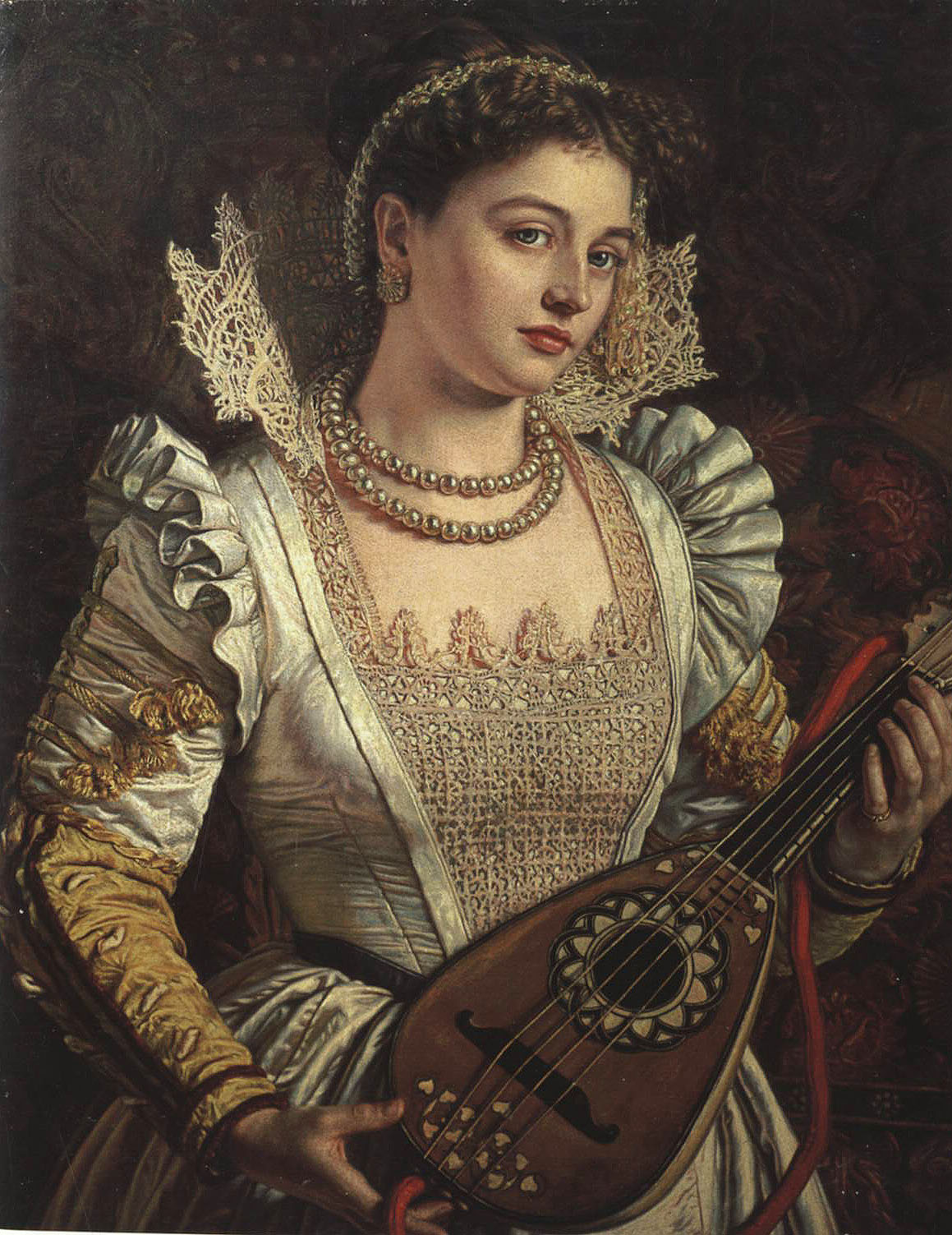
Bianca, William Holman Hunt, oil on canvas, 1868–1869

Most of the works collected in the Museum's early years were by artists that had strong Sussex links. However there were exceptions include Nicholas Roerich, Hobbema, Wynants and a piece from the School of Bassano. The collection diversified to include the main movements in British painting and includes Bianca (1869), a painting by William Holman Hunt. There are also works by Lucien Pissarro and Ivon Hitchens.

Sculpture is represented through works by John Skelton, Philip Jackson, Dora Gordine and Anthony Stevens who are all nationally recognised but have links to the region. The Museum acquired Skelton's The Diver (1970), a carving in walnut wood, in 2008. This was made possible through the V&A Purchase Fund and the Friends of the Worthing Museum.

The Art Gallery regularly hosts visiting exhibitions such as Jon Edgar in 2010 and Dora Gordine in 2011, in association with Kingston University's Dorich House Museum.

== History ==
From March 2025 to March 2026 the museum was closed while it underwent renovations and was given a connection to the Worthing Heat Network.`
