= Cissbury Ring =

Prehistoric sites near Worthing, West Sussex, England

Coordinates: 50.858°N 0.375°W

- Site of Special Scientific Interest
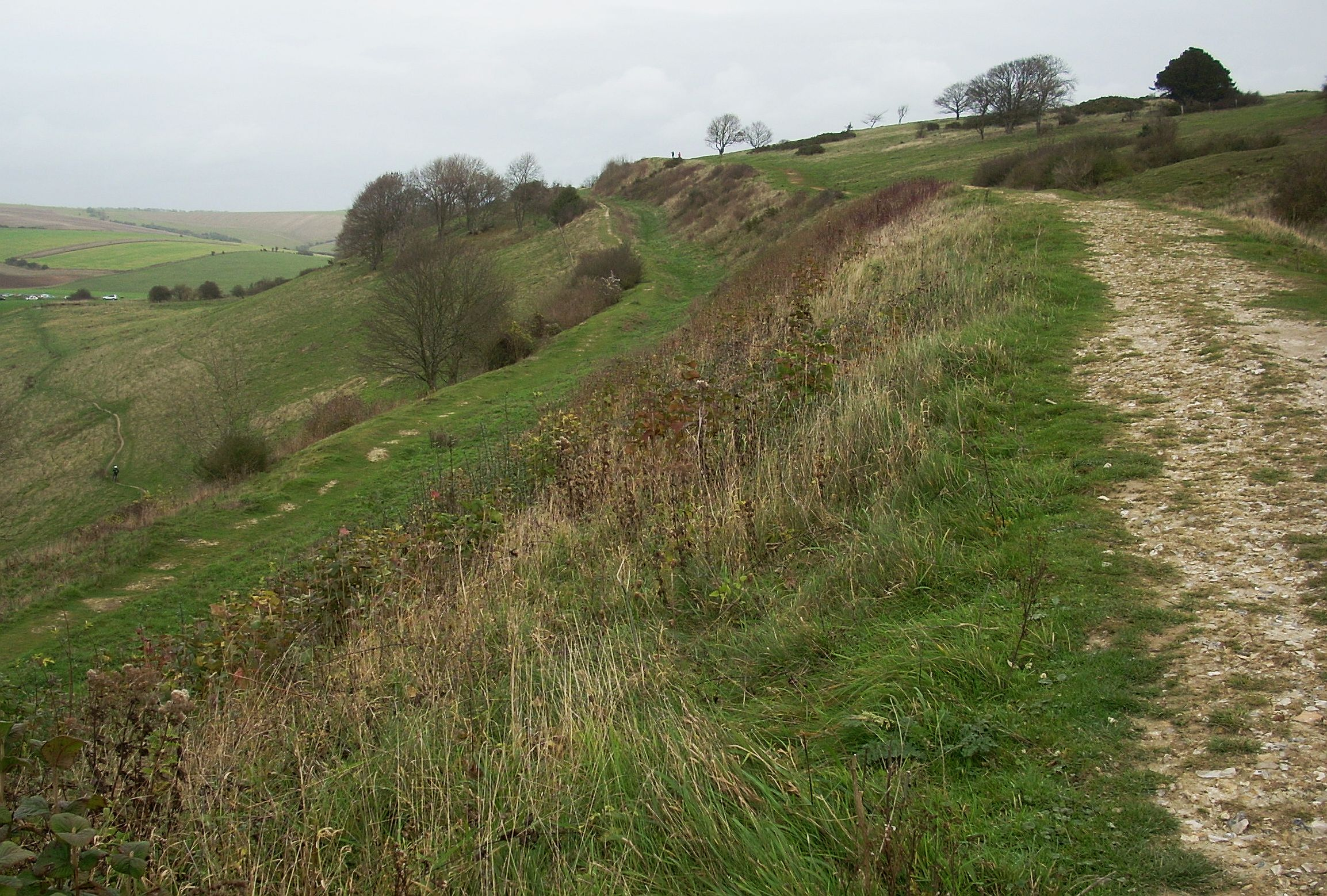
- Rampart of Cissbury Ring
- Location of Cissbury Ring.
- Area of search: West Sussex
- Grid reference: TQ 145 078
- Interest: Biological
- Area: 84.2 hectares (208 acres)
- Notification date: 1986
- Location map: Magic Map

Cissbury Ring is an 84.2-hectare (208-acre) biological Site of Special Scientific Interest north of Worthing in West Sussex. It is owned by the National Trust and is designated a Scheduled monument for its Neolithic flint mine and Iron Age hillfort.

Cissbury Ring is the largest hill fort in Sussex, the second largest in England and one of the largest in Europe overall, covering some 60 acres (24 hectares). The earthworks that form the fortifications were built around the beginning of the Middle Iron-Age possibly around 250 BC but abandoned in the period 50 BC - 50 AD.

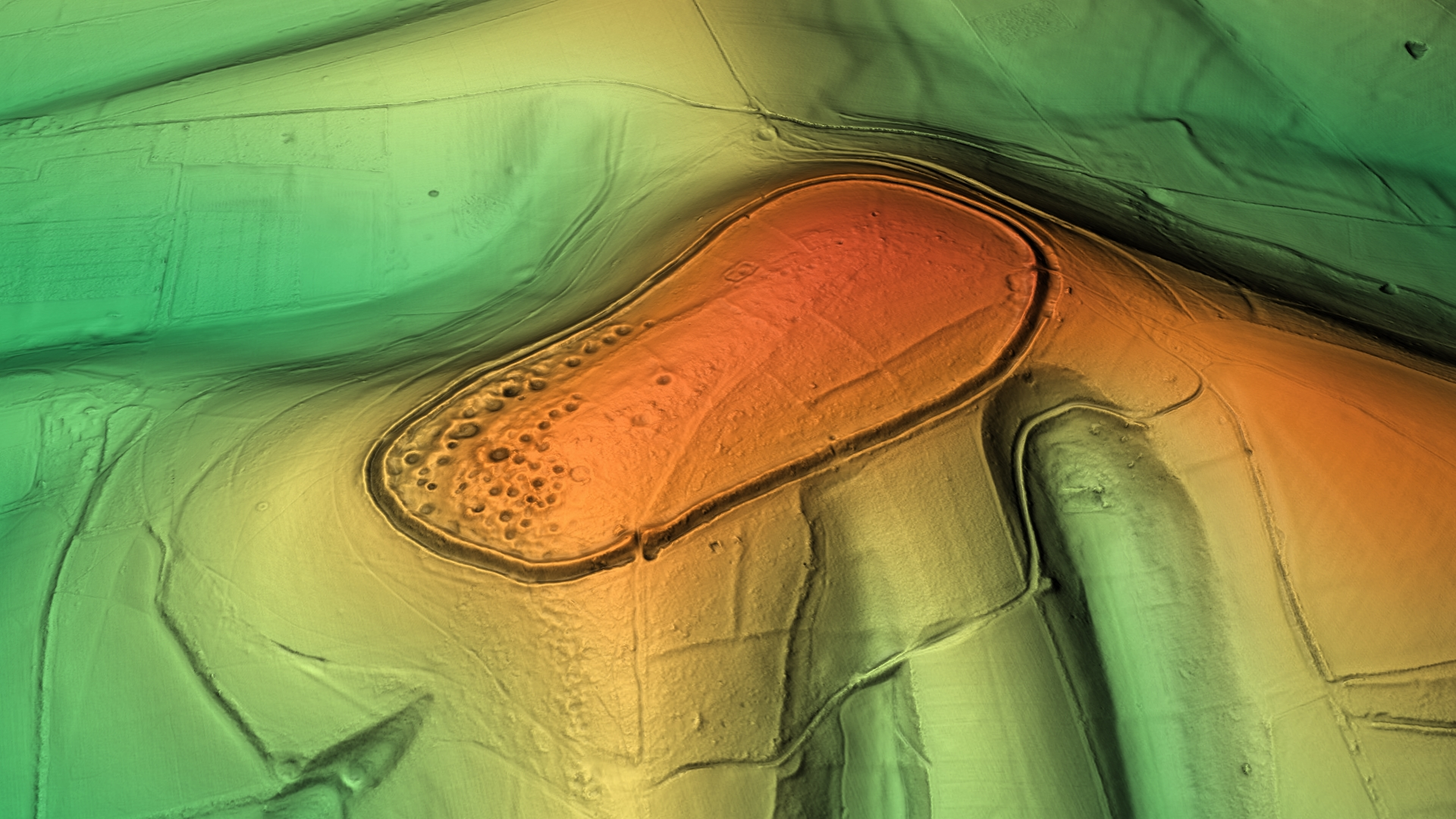
3D view of the digital terrain model

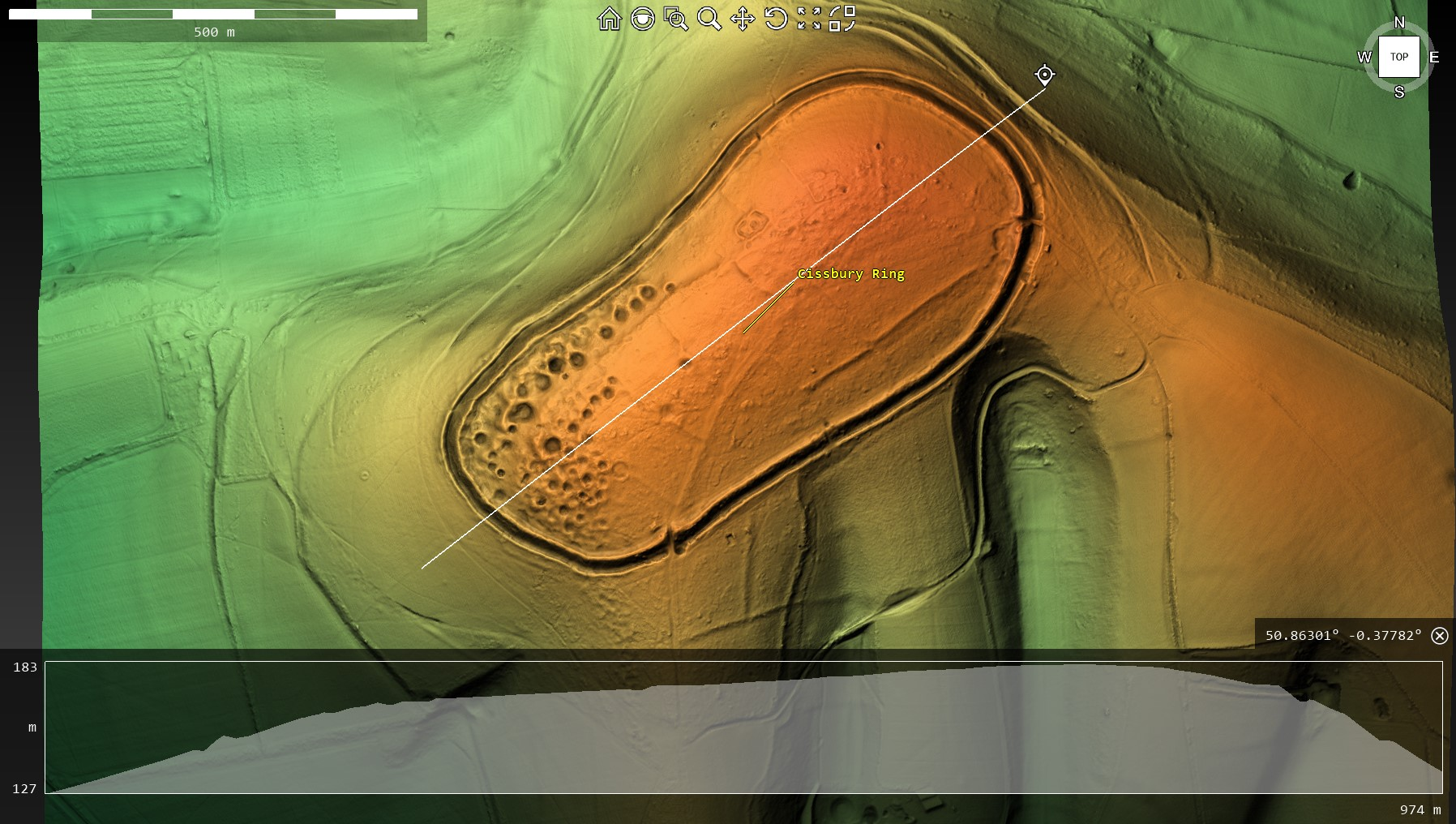
Cissbury Ring 3D model

Cissbury Ring 3D model video

The site of the fort contains a Neolithic mine, one of the first flint mines in Britain. Around 270 shafts were dug into Cissbury hill over around 300 years of use. Shafts were up to 12 metres (39 ft) deep with 7 metres (23 ft) diameters at the surface. Up to eight galleries extended outwards from the bottoms of the shafts, often interconnecting with one another. The site has been damaged by illicit metal detecting.

== Structure ==
The ditches and banks are the remains of a defensive wall that enclosed 65 acres (260,000 m^{2}) of land; the inner band of the wall is over a mile around. The ditches are said to be as deep as three metres. The banks were filled with loosened chalk and covered with timber palisade. The 600 foot (184 m) hill is open to the public. From the top, one is able to see to the west Selsey, Chichester Cathedral, the Spinnaker Tower in Portsmouth, and the Isle of Wight. To the east, one is able to see Brighton, the Seven Sisters and Beachy Head. Cissbury Ring is the highest point in the borough of Worthing.

== History ==
Several Bronze Age barrows have been found just outside Cissbury Ring. In the Romano-British period, farmers settled within the ramparts of the hill fort.

In 1867–68 Augustus Lane-Fox excavated part of Cissbury Ring.

During World War II, Cissbury Ring was used as a camp for the 2nd Argyll and Sutherland Highlanders in preparation for the Normandy landings in 1944. At this time much of the fort within the ramparts was ploughed to provide food. While on manoeuvres, tanks destroyed the dew pond at the north side of the fort. A gap was made in the ramparts to accommodate a 100 lb (45 kg) gun which was used to fire at ships in the English Channel and an anti-aircraft gun was sited by the gap.

Artefacts from Cissbury Ring can be found at Worthing Museum and Art Gallery, the Museum of Sussex Archaeology, Lewes and the Ashmolean Museum, Oxford. Silver pennies from the reign of Æthelred the Unready (978-1016) can be found at the British Museum.

== Etymology ==
The name Cissbury was traditionally taken to mean Caesar's fort (after Julius Caesar) or Cissa's fort (after Cissa, son of South Saxon king Ælle), but both theories have been discounted. In the early eleventh century in the reign of Æthelred the Unready, Cissbury was known as Sith(m)esteburh, which is taken to mean the 'last or the latest fort'. This may mean that Cissbury was the last fort to be refortified, after another nearby fort such as that at Burpham. It seems that the name Cissbury was altered to accommodate the legend that the fort was linked to Cissa the South Saxon.

== Flint mines ==
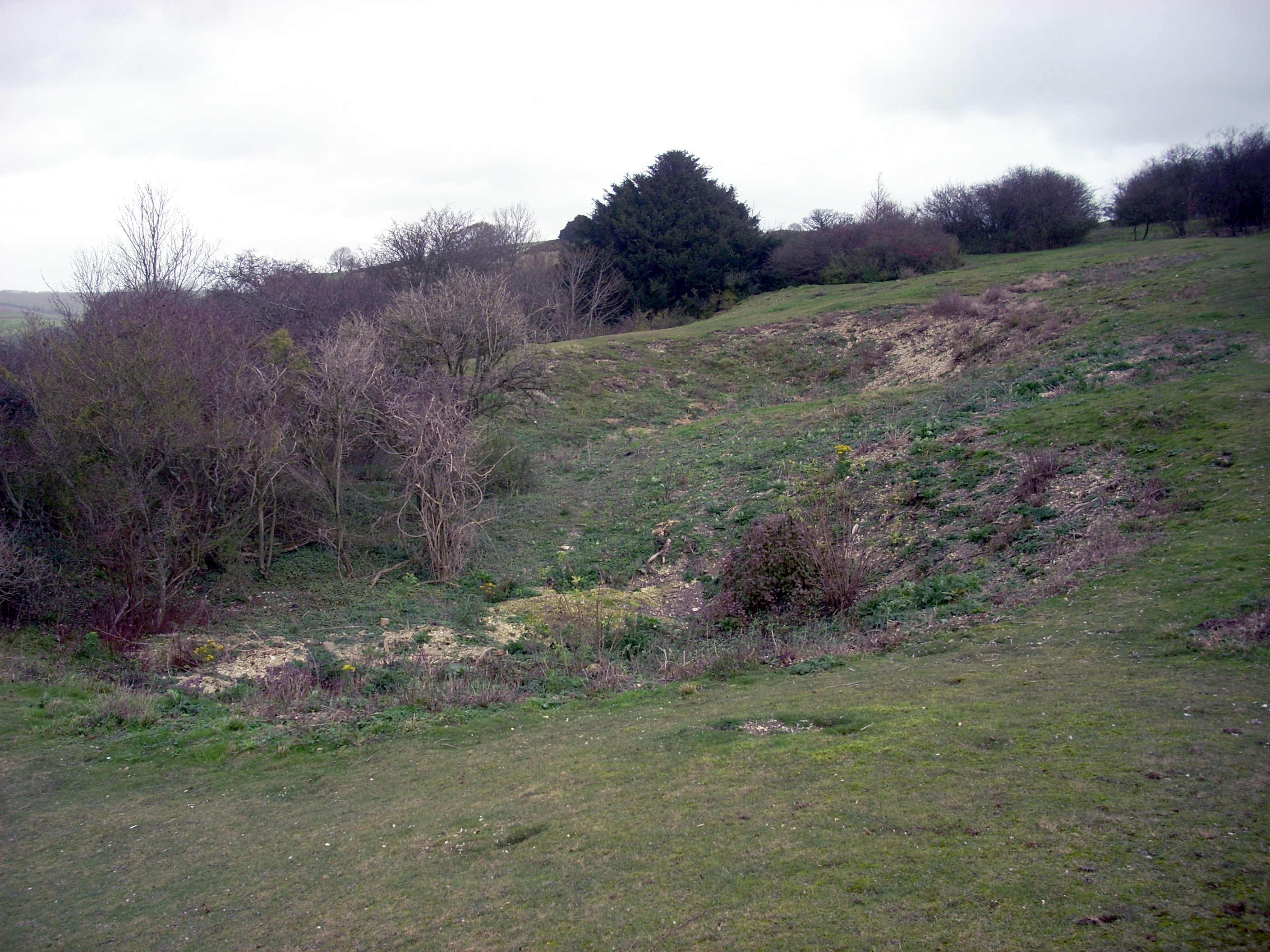
Neolithic flint mine

Long before the hill was fortified, flint mines were being excavated in the area. Some shafts went down as far as 40 feet (12 m). The shafts at Cissbury were excavated with antler picks, much like those at Grimes Graves and elsewhere. Flint was the common material for making stone axes for felling timber and working wood during the Neolithic period.

The site was one of the first Neolithic flint mines in Britain and it was exploited throughout the period (the nearby Harrow Hill series of flint mines is slightly older). It is part of a group of flint mines in Sussex which followed a rich seam of flint-bearing chalk. Other examples include Grimes Graves in Norfolk, and Harrow Hill nearby. Cissbury was one of several important mining industries in the UK during the Neolithic and is thought to have been used into the Bronze Age, and later the Iron Age though flint mining probably stopped during the late neolithic, but there is some evidence of re-use of flint for tools during later times. Axes and Blades (struck from cores) account for most of the tools produced at Cissbury and examples of Cissbury flint can be found as far as Italy. Axes were produced on site, as rough-outs, these were then traded or used off site. Many other types of stone were in demand for stone axes such as the greenstone of the Langdale axe industry in the Lake District. The axes were essential for forest clearance for farming in the Neolithic period, and found many other uses, such as wood working.

Around 270 shafts were dug into the Cissbury hill over around 900 years of use. Shafts were up to 12 metres (39 ft) deep with 7 metres (23 ft) diameters at the surface. Up to eight galleries extended outwards from the bottoms of the shafts, often interconnecting with one another.

Excavation of the mine shafts by John Pull in the 1950s uncovered the remains of a young woman who had apparently been killed in a tunnel collapse. This individual was recently radiocarbon dated to c. 3700 BC. Charcoal, possibly from her torch, and a miniature whale carved from bone were with her. The miniature carved whale has since been identified as an 18th-century gaming piece, and was probably thrown in by a local at night during the excavation of the mine shaft. The possibility that the shaft was used for a ritual burial has also been suggested, however. The remains of two other people, a man and a woman, were recovered from different shafts at Cissbury in the nineteenth century, and it has been suggested that the exhausted mines had a secondary purpose for formal burial. Alternatively, it may have been expedient to send women into the mines as they could squeeze into the narrow galleries, and some archaeologists have suggested that flint extraction was a rite of passage for the more slightly built juvenile members of Neolithic societies.

The site is significant as it represents the switch from open-cast flint extraction favoured previously by prehistoric peoples who exploited deposits of flint close to the surface, to deep shaft mining, which required more effort but produced more flint of a higher quality.

== Biology ==
The site has unimproved chalk grassland, scrub and neutral grassland. Upright brome is dominant in the chalk grassland, while common grasses in the neutral grassland include Yorkshire fog, sheep's fescue and creeping bent. The scrub areas provide important habitats for birds and butterflies.

== See also ==
- Worthing Downland Estate
