= Diane de France =

French noblewoman (1538–1619)

- suo jure Duchess of Angoulême; Duchess of Castro
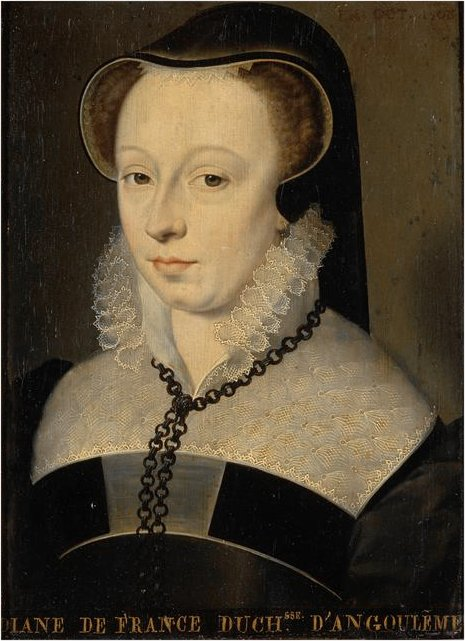
- 1568 portrait
- Born: 25 July 1538
- Died: 11 January 1619 (aged 80); Paris, Kingdom of France
- Noble family: Valois-Angoulême; Farnese (by marriage); Montmorency (by marriage)
- Spouses: Orazio Farnese, Duke of Castro (m. 1552; died 1553) François de Montmorency (m. 1559; died 1579)
- Father: Henry II of France
- Mother: Filippa Duci

Diane de France, suo jure Duchess of Angoulême (25 July 1538 – 11 January 1619) was the illegitimate daughter of Henry II of France and his Italian lover Filippa Duci. Diane played an important political role during the French Wars of Religion and built the Hôtel d'Angoulême in Paris. She was the favorite of her half-brother, Henry III of France.

== Birth and early life ==
Born 25 July 1538, Diane was the illegitimate daughter of eighteen-year-old dauphin Henry and Filippa Duci, the daughter of a minor Italian nobleman of Fossano in the Piedmont. Diane had been conceived when her father was in Moncalieri in northern Italy on a military campaign. It is not known whether she was born at court or was brought there when still very young. At court, her care and upbringing were entrusted to Henry's younger sister, Margaret.

Diane's father treated her well: her household included a governess, tutors, maids of honor, chamber valets, and even a tailor. She learned to write in excellent French, the proof of which can be seen in the large number letters that still survive. She also learned Italian (the second language of the court), Spanish, and enough Latin for religious ceremonies. Her artistic education was not neglected: she also learned to play lute and other instruments, and to sing.

She was not formally legitimised until much later, in 1572 (not 1547 as previously believed).

== First marriage ==
On 13 February 1552, when Diane de France was thirteen, a contract was signed by which she married Orazio Farnese, Duke of Castro (French: Horace Farnèse). The wedding ceremony on 15 February 1553 was attended by Orazio's brother Cardinal Alessandro Farnese and included masquerades and carnival banquets. She became a widow five months later, on 18 July 1553, when Orazio was killed while serving with French forces at the siege of Hesdin. She spent her period of mourning at the Château de Chantilly, home of Anne de Montmorency, Connétable de France, then returned to court in the service of Catherine de Medici.

== Second marriage ==
Diane's second marriage was to François de Montmorency, eldest son of Anne de Montmorency, by a contract of 3 May 1557 and a ceremony that took place on 4 June 1557 at the Château de Villers-Cotterêts. They had a son, named Anne after his grandfather, born by late September 1560 but dead before 15 October.

On 22 June 1563, after the death of her father and then her half-brother Francis II, the new king, her half-brother Charles IX gave her, by lettres patentes signed at the Château de Vincennes, the Duchy of Châtellerault. The annual revenues of about 6,000 livres were meant to compensate for the gift of 50,000 écus promised for her first marriage but never paid from the royal treasury. The revenues from this duchy were far less than what she was owed. After the death of Charles, Diane became a favourite of the new king, her other half-brother Henri III. In February 1576, he signed additional lettres patentes, giving her the lands and seigneuries of Coucy and Folembray, including the Château de Folembray (both in today's département of Aisne), as well as some other estates in the Bourbonnais.

Diane was widowed for a second time in 1579, after helping make her husband a leader of the politiques, a moderate Catholic group in France.

== Later life ==
In August 1582, Henry III gave her the Duchy of Angoulême in exchange for that of Châtellerault, making her Duchess of Angoulême in appanage (during her lifetime only). The new title came with increased wealth, so in 1584 she started building a new Paris residence, the Hôtel d'Angoulême (now the Hôtel Lamoignon). Construction was likely interrupted by the Wars of Religion, and only completed with a second phase of construction in 1611.

Diane was influential in the reconciliation of Henry III with Henry of Navarre and enjoyed much respect at court when the latter became king as Henry IV. She also helped to raise her niece, Charlotte de Montmorency, with whom Henry IV was later to fall in love.

Diane died on 11 January 1619 in Paris. Her surviving letters reveal her as a woman of "great courage and tolerance".

== Bibliography ==
- Brooks, Jeanice (2000). Courtly Song in Late Sixteenth-Century France. University of Chicago Press. ISBN 0-226-07587-7.
- Cooper, Richard (2007). "Legate's Luxury: The Entries of Cardinal Alessandro Farnese to Avignon and Carpentras, 1553", pp. 133–161, in French Ceremonial Entries in the Sixteenth Century: Event, Image, Text, edited by Nicolas Russell and Hélène Visentin. Toronto: Centre for Reformation and Renaissance Studies. ISBN 978-0-7727-2033-7
- Gamrath, Helge (2007). Farnese: Pomp, Power and Politics in Renaissance Italy. L'Erma di Bretschneider. ISBN 9788882654269.
- Knecht, R. J. (1998). Catherine de' Medici. London: Longman. ISBN 0-582-08241-2.
- Lanza, Janine M. (2007). From Wives to Widows in Early Modern Paris: Gender, Economy, and Law. Ashgate Publishing. ISBN 978-0-7546-5643-2.
- Lhote, Claude; Troquet, Claude (2013). Diane, bâtarde du roi, princesse de la Renaissance (in French). Éditions LULU.com. ISBN 978-1-291-34373-1. The preface was written by Bernard Barbiche, professor emeritus of the École des Chartes.
- Mariéjol, Jean-H. (1920). Catherine de Medicis (1519-1589). Hachette.
- Merrill, Robert V. (1935). "Considerations on 'Les Amours de I. du Bellay'", Modern Philology, vol. 33, no. 2 (November, 1935), pp. 129-138. JSTOR 433932.
- Pébay-Clottes, Isabelle; Troquet, Claude (1990). "Philippe Desducs, mère de Diane de France". Bibliothèque de l'École des chartes (in French). 148 (1): 151–160. JSTOR 43014049.
- Pébay, Isabelle; Troquet, Claude (1992). "Les hôtels d'Angoulême sous Diane de France". In de Andia, Béatrice; Gady, Alexandre (eds.). La rue des Francs-Bourgeois au Marais (in French). Délégation à l'action artistique de la Ville de Paris. OCLC 965245235.
- Picot, Émile (1907). Les français italianisants au XVIe siècle (in French). Vol. 2. Honoré Champion.
- Setton, Kenneth M. (1984). The Papacy and the Levant (1204-1571). Volume IV. The Sixteenth Century from Julius III to Pius V. Philadelphia: The American Philosophical Society. ISBN 978-0-87169-162-0.
