= Filippa Duci =

Italian courtesan, mistress of French King Henry II

- Born: 1520; Moncalieri, Duchy of Savoy
- Died: before October 1586 (aged 65–66) near Tours, Kingdom of France
- Other names: Filippa Ducci
- Occupation: Courtesan
- Title: Dame de Couy
- Spouse: Jean Bernardin de Saint-Severin (m. 1546)
- Partner: Henry II of France
- Children: Diane de France

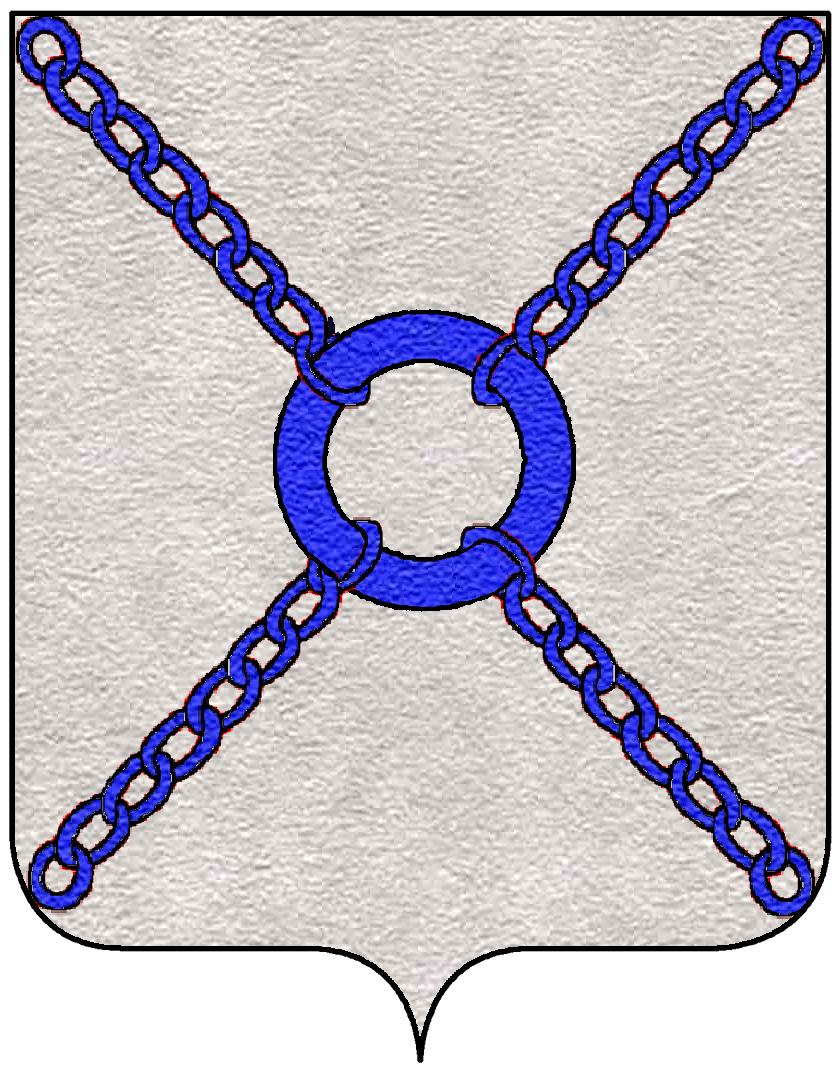
Coat of arms of the Ducci family

Filippa Duci (or Ducci), dame de Couy (French: Philippe Desducs; 1520 – before October 1586) was an Italian-born French noblewoman, the mistress of Henry II and the mother of Diane de France.

== Life ==
Born in Moncalieri, Filippa's father was Gian Antonio Duci, member of a minor Italian noble family. During the Italian Wars in 1537, the French dauphin Henry (later Henry II of France) stayed with a squire, Filippa's brother, also named Gian Antonio Duci. Henry was seduced by Filippa on first sight, and she became his mistress. When Henri heard Duci was pregnant, he arranged for her to be maintained until she gave birth. Duci gave birth to their daughter, Diane de France, in Paris in 1538. This proved that Henry was not sterile; he had been married to Catherine de Médici, yet had still not produced an heir due to urological problems. The baby was named Diane after Henry's love, his mistress Diane de Poitiers, who raised the child along with her own two children.

In 1541, Filippa was granted 400 livres tournois a year for life in an Ordinaire de Touraine and was allowed to retire to a Piedmontese convent by Francis I of France. She married the Italian gentleman and privy councillor Jean Bernardin de Saint-Severin in 1546. After Diane was legitimized, Filippa was known as dame de Bléré en Touraine. In 1582, she became a lady in waiting to queen dowager Catherine de Médici.

== Bibliography ==
- Carroll, Leslie (2010). Notorious Royal Marriages: A Juicy Journey Through Nine Centuries of Dynasty, Destiny, and Desire. Penguin. ISBN 9781101159774.
- Frieda, Leonie (2018). Francis I: The Maker of Modern France. Orion. ISBN 9781474605588.
- Kent, Princess Michael of (2005). The Serpent and the Moon: Two Rivals for the Love of a Renaissance King. Simon and Schuster. ISBN 9780743251068.
- Marshall, Rosalind Kay (2006). Queen Mary's Women: Female Relatives, Servants, Friends and Enemies of Mary, Queen of Scots. John Donald. ISBN 9780859766678.
- Stedall, Robert (2012). The Challenge to the Crown: Volume I: The Struggle for Influence in the Reign of Mary Queen of Scots 1542-1567. Book Guild Publishing. ISBN 9781846246463.
