= Jacques Du Brœucq =

Sculptor and architect from the Netherlands

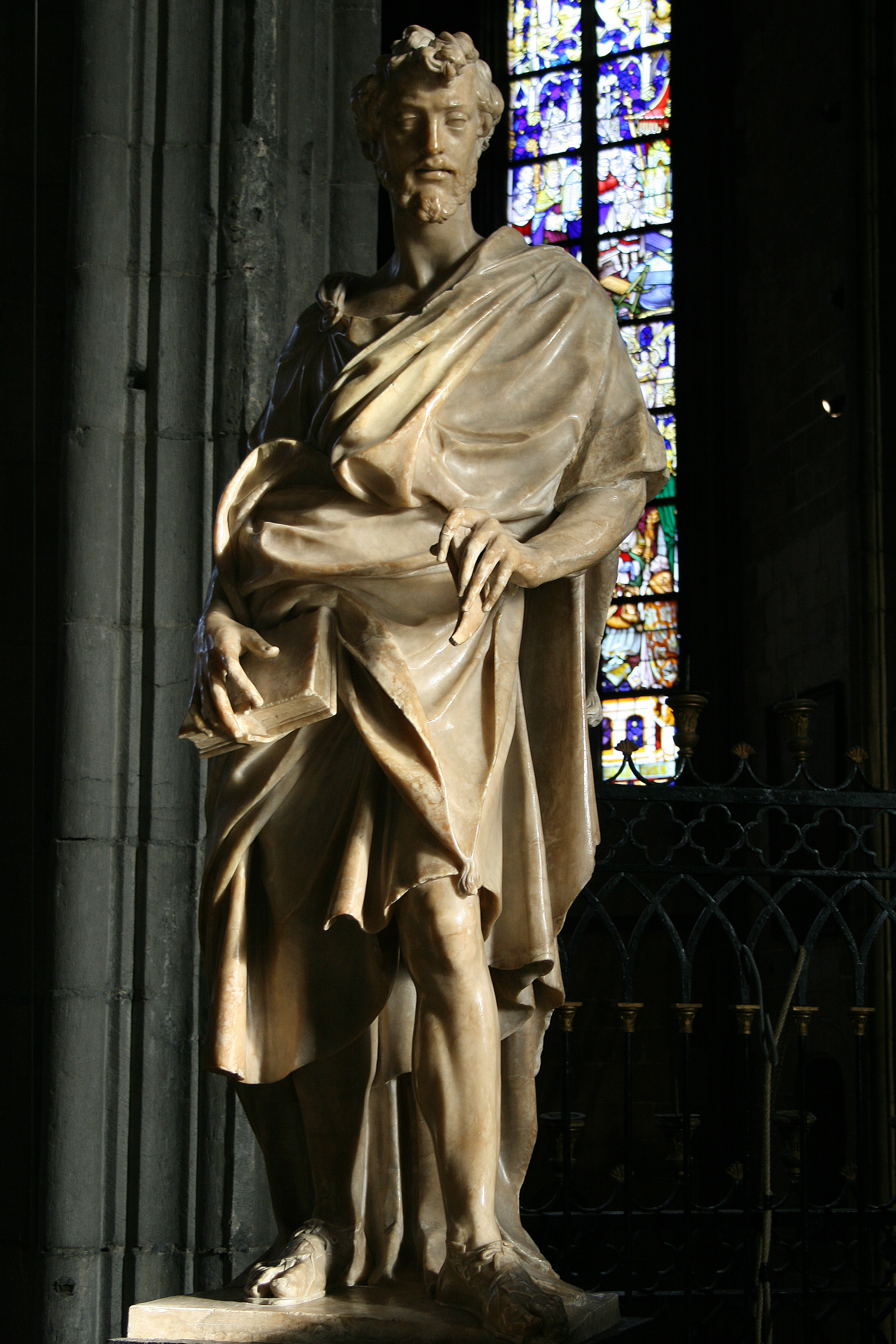
Saint Bartholomew, in the Saint Waltrude Collegiate Church in Mons.

Jacques Du Brœucq (c.1505 – c.1584) was a sculptor and architect from the Southern Netherlands, who is believed to have spent c. 1530-35 in Italy.

Jacques Du Brœucq was born and died in Mons and is perhaps best known as the teacher of Giambologna in Antwerp.

Du Brœucq rebuilt Binche Palace south of Brussels for Queen Mary of Hungary, governess of the Spanish Netherlands, in 1545–49; Binche, the center of Mary's patronage, was intended to rival Fontainebleau; it was demolished by the soldiers of Henry II of France in 1554.

He also designed the castle of Boussu and Château of Mariemont.

One of his most famous apprentices was Jean Boulogne, better known as Giovanni Bologne or Giambologna.

== Artworks ==
- Mausoleum of the Counts of Boussu, Church of Boussu.
