= Binche Palace =

Former royal residence in Binche, Belgium

- Palais de Binche (French)
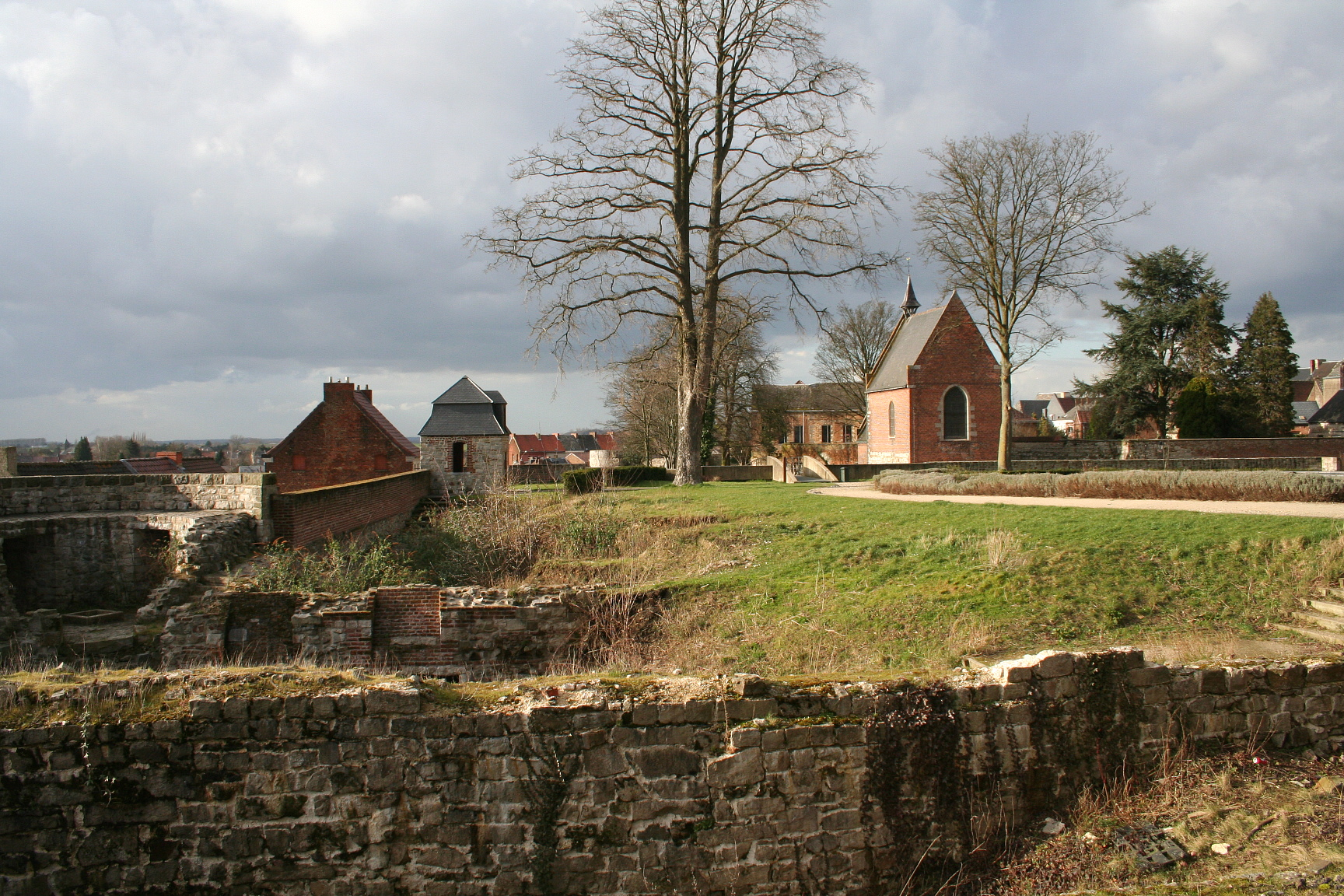
- The unearthed ruins of Binche Palace
- Interactive map of the Binche Palace area
- Former names: Binche Castle

General information
- Type: Palace
- Architectural style: Renaissance
- Location: Binche, Belgium
- Coordinates: 50°24′29″N 4°09′54″E
- Construction started: 1546
- Completed: 1549
- Client: Queen Mary of Hungary

Design and construction
- Architect: Jacques Du Brœucq

Binche Palace (French: Palais de Binche) was a royal residence located in Binche, in today's Belgian province of Hainaut, Wallonia. The medieval castle and subsequent Renaissance palace served as residence for the counts of Hainaut, the dukes of Burgundy and the Habsburg rulers of the Netherlands.

The palace was built between 1546 and 1549 by order of Queen Mary of Hungary, governor of the Netherlands, and was one of the first Renaissance palaces in the Low Countries, intended to rival the French Palace of Fontainebleau. It was destroyed by soldiers of King Henry II of France in 1554. Nowadays, only some medieval walls and foundations of the castle and palace remain.

== History ==
=== Medieval origins: Binche Castle ===
Baldwin IV, Count of Hainaut, also known as Baldwin the Builder, constructed the first castle in Binche in the 12th century. At the same time, he surrounded the city by large walls, which are almost entirely preserved till modern times. The château was known as the "Château de la Salles" during the 15th century. Philip the Good, duke of Burgundy, restored the castle in 1461. Margaret of York, widow of Charles the Bold, duke of Burgundy, received Binche as a dowry. She extended the castle around 1500.

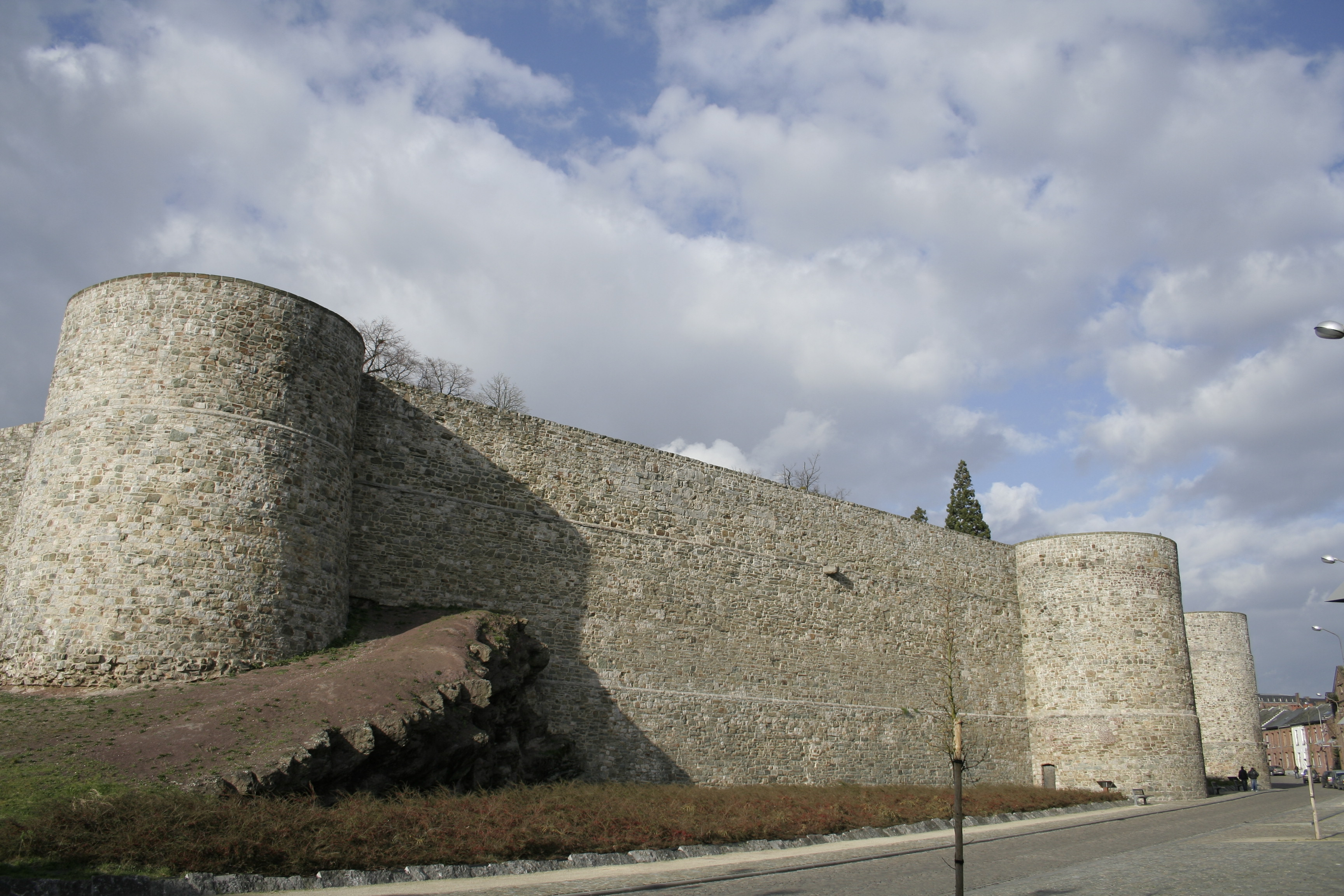
The remaining walls of the medieval castle of Binche

The castle appears on the city's coat of arms.

=== Mary of Hungary ===
==== Construction of the Renaissance palace ====
Queen Mary of Hungary became governor of the Netherlands in 1528. She often stayed in Binche, which soon became one of her favourite residences. Her brother, Charles V, Holy Roman Emperor, presented the city and the imperial estate of Binche to her in 1545. Mary decided to raze the medieval castle to the ground and to construct a magnificent and sumptuous palace in its place. It was one of the first Renaissance palaces in the Netherlands. The architect-sculptor Jacques Du Brœucq was responsible for the design. He also constructed for Mary a hunting lodge close by to Binche in Morlanwelz, called the Château of Mariemont (literally, "Mary-Mount"). The construction of Binche Palace took three years, and the building looked very similar to a Renaissance castle earlier designed and constructed by Du Broeucq in Boussu. Of the old medieval castle, only the wing renovated by Margaret of York remained.

The palace complex consisted of two towers and a two-story main building and two additional one-story wings. In addition, there was a chapel. There were various halls, a grand and a small gallery, dining rooms, kitchens, stables and other buildings. Most impressive were the large hall on the first floor (30 by 13.5 metres) and the 'riche logis' of Mary (18 by 9 metres). The palace was hailed as one of the wonders of the world.

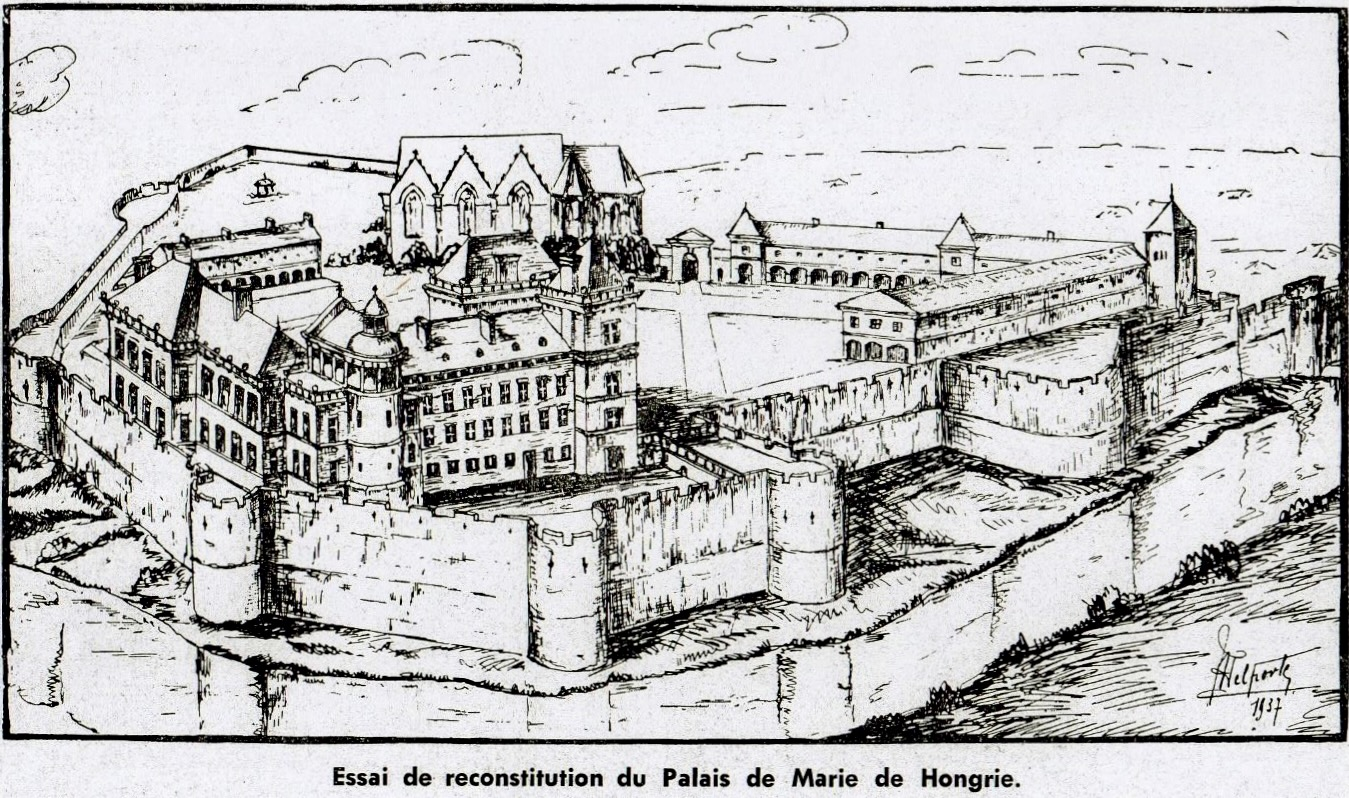
Reconstruction of Binche Palace

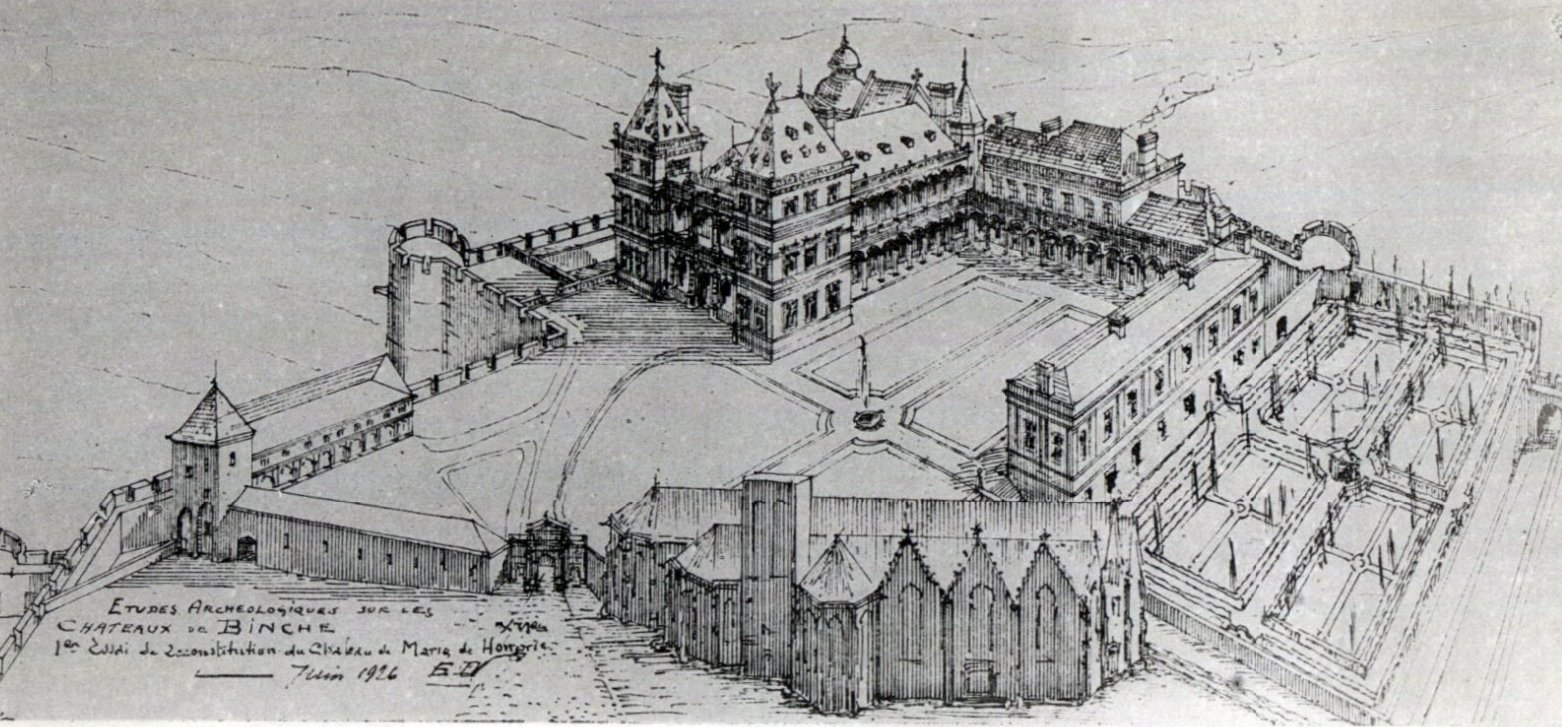
Reconstruction of Binche Palace

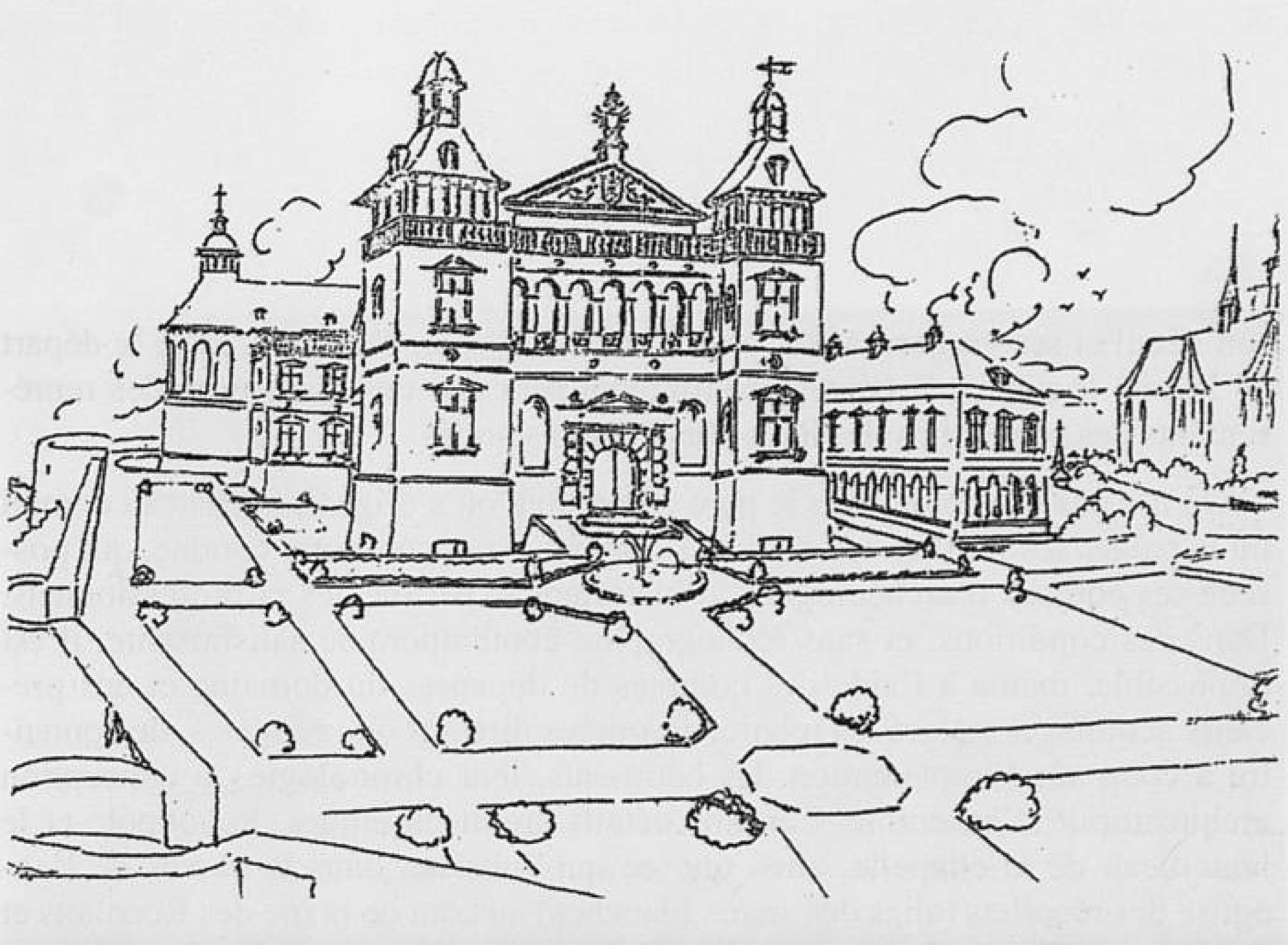
Reconstruction of Binche Palace

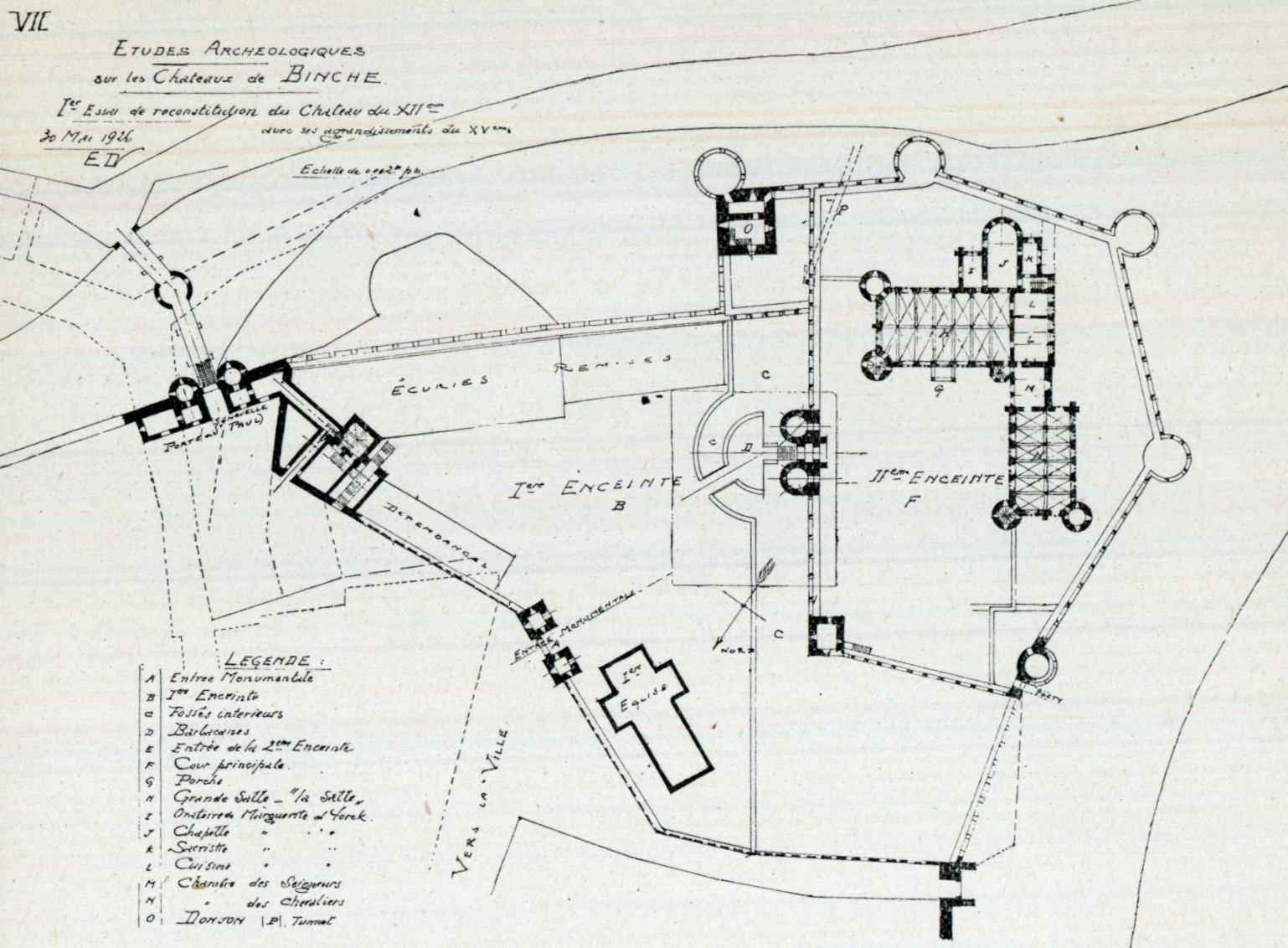
Plan of Binche Palace

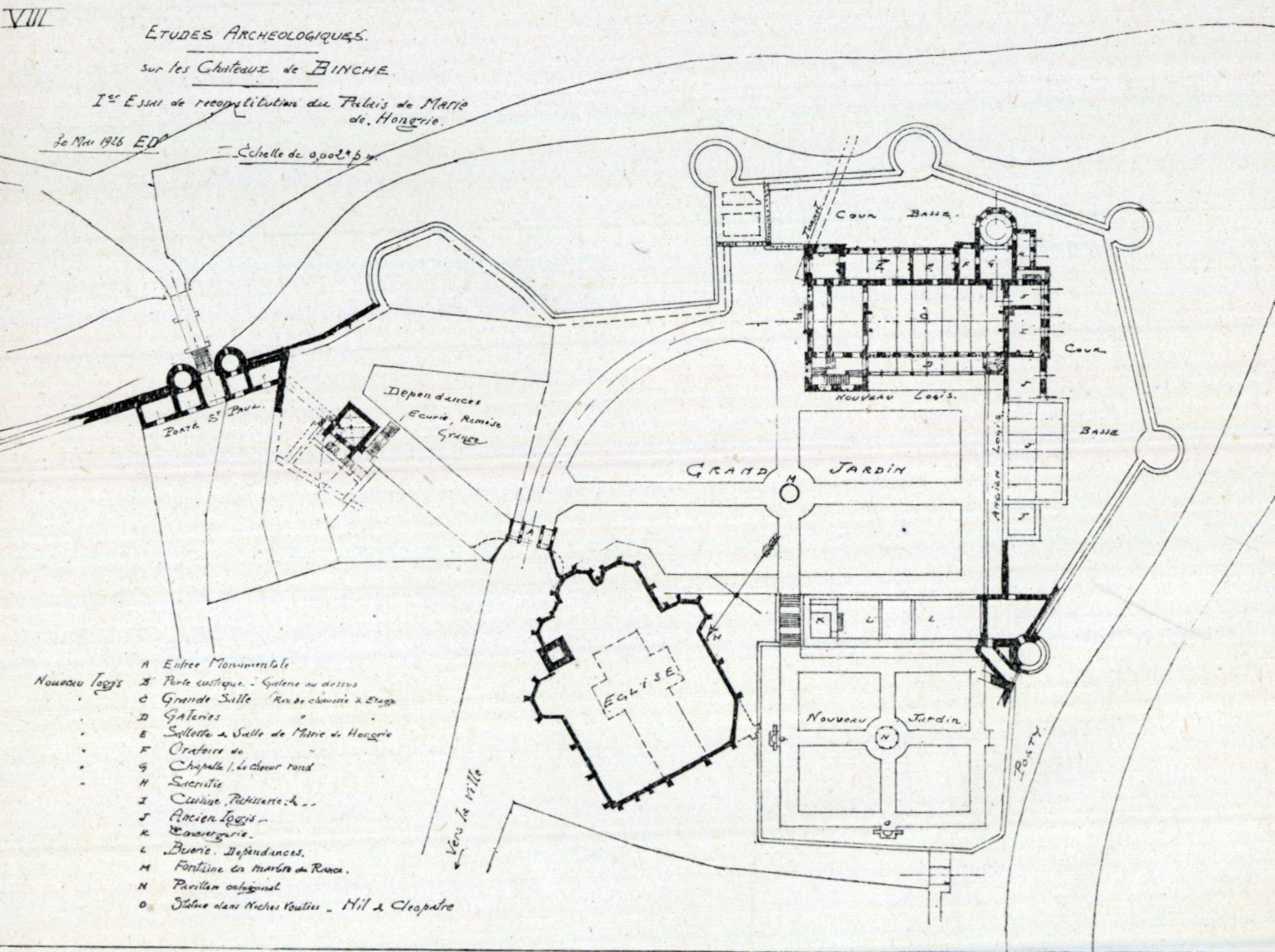
Plan of Binche Palace

==== The fire of 1554 ====
In 1549, Mary organized the "Triumph of Binche" for her brother Charles V and her nephew, the future King Philip II. The year before, the aging emperor had decided to have his son recognized as successor by the various principalities that made up his realm. On 22 August 1549, the Imperial procession arrived in Binche. The governor was aware of the importance of the event and organized a grand reception, intended to move the public. Parties, balls and tournaments followed each other for six days. On 28 August, the masquerade ball was in full swing in the great hall of the palace, when gentlemen disguised as "savages" suddenly kidnapped four ladies in medieval dress to Mariemont. The next day, in front of the whole court and with some 20,000 spectators from the surrounding area, a thousand men commanded by the prince of Piedmont and count of Ligne surrounded the palace, stormed it and freed the prisoners. When asked "who kidnapped them this way, they said they did not recognize them at first, but eventually found out they were their husbands".

Shortly after these festivities, the old conflict between Spain and France flared up again. In the spring of 1554, the Imperial army entered Picardy under the command of Adriaan van Croÿ, 1st Count of Roeulx, and ravaged the country up to 70 km from Paris. They destroyed the palace of Folembray, the love nest of Henry II of France and Diana de Poitiers. However, the French troops counterattacked. On 21 July, they raided Binche and Mariemont, whose palaces were set on fire in retaliation. Henry lit the fire himself and had a placard affixed to the ruins: "Queen of folly, remember Folembray!"

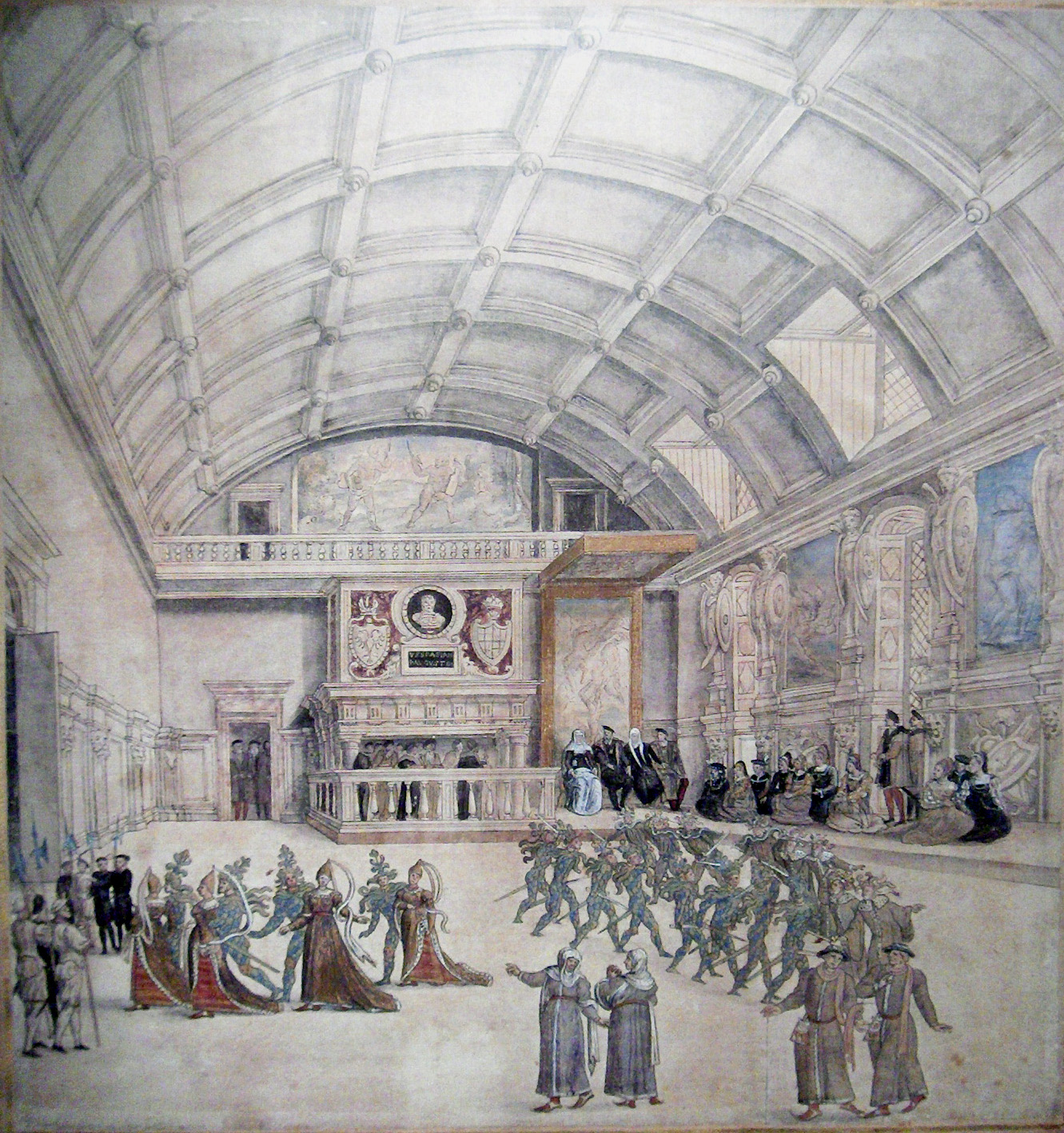
The large hall of Binche Palace, which was constructed between 1546 and 1548

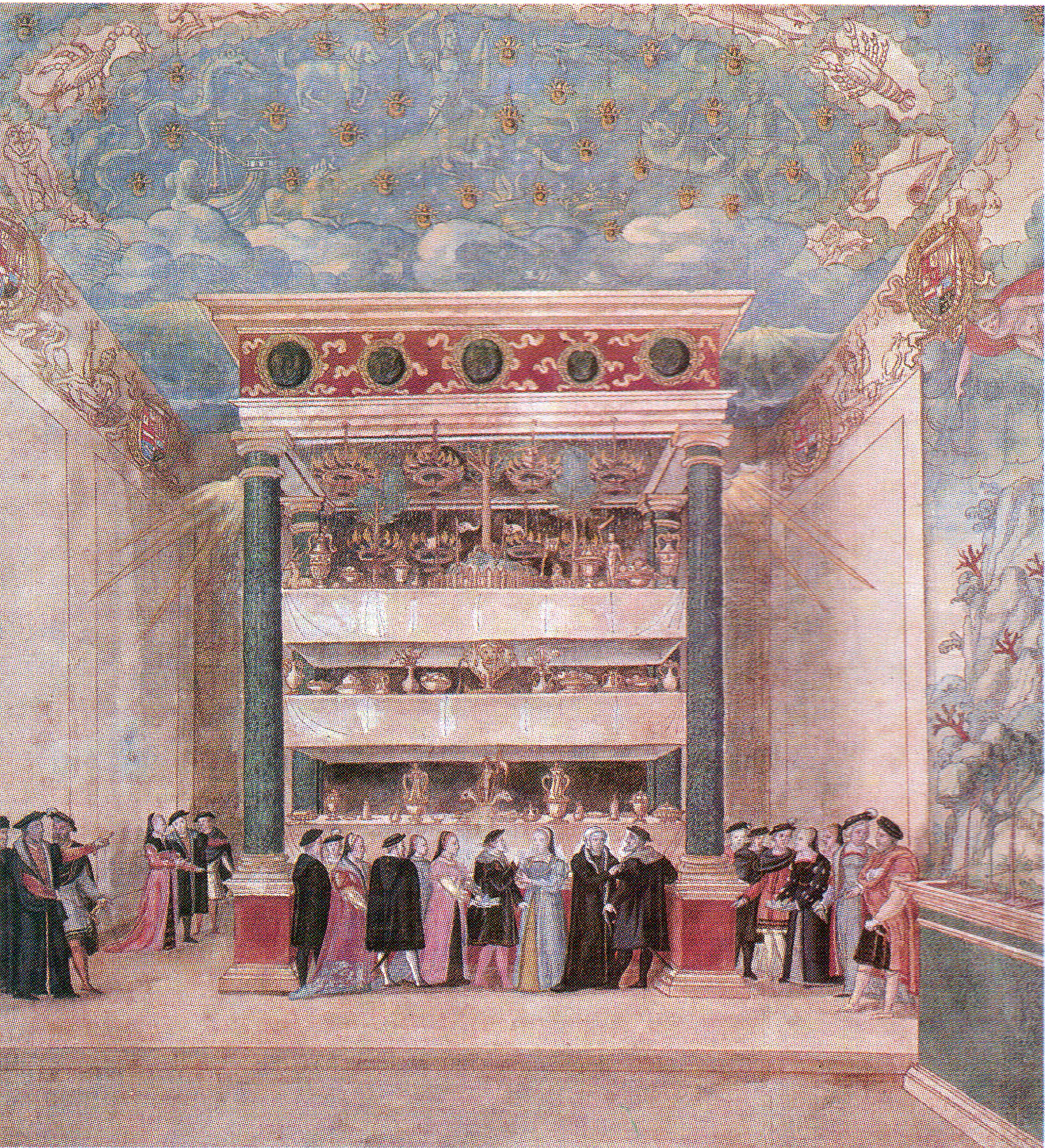
The representation hall of Binche Palace with a decorated astrological ceiling

==== Aftermath and destruction ====
Parts of Binche Palace were saved from destruction. Restoration work started already in 1554, but stopped when Mary left the Netherlands in 1556 to go to Spain together with her brother after his resignation. Upon return to Spain, Philip II was so impressed by Binche Palace that it also served as inspiration for the construction of the royal palaces in Aranjuez, El Pardo, and Valsain.

Under Archdukes Albert and Isabella of Austria, sovereign of the Netherlands, a restoration was attempted but failed to reach completion, as the palace of Mariemont was restored as well, and the palace of Binche fell out of grace. A number of sculpted pieces were sent to Mons (such as the entrance gate) or were reused in Binche itself. In the second half of the 17th century, the palace fell into ruins and around 1704, the palace was demolished. A public park was created on the remains in the 19th century.

Large parts of the palace were excavated and examined by the archaeological department of Wallonia in the 20th century.

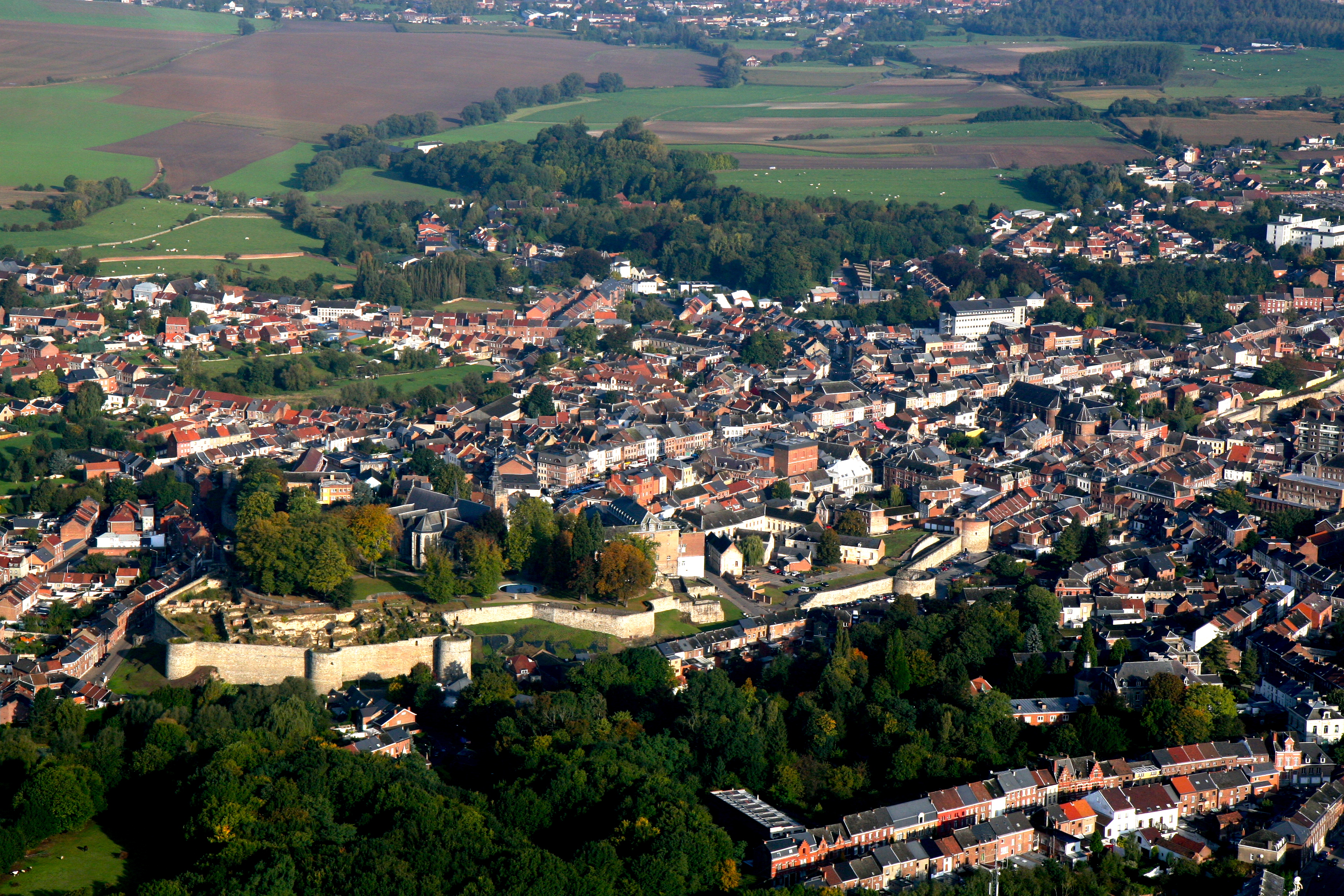
Aerial view of Binche with the palace ruins on the left

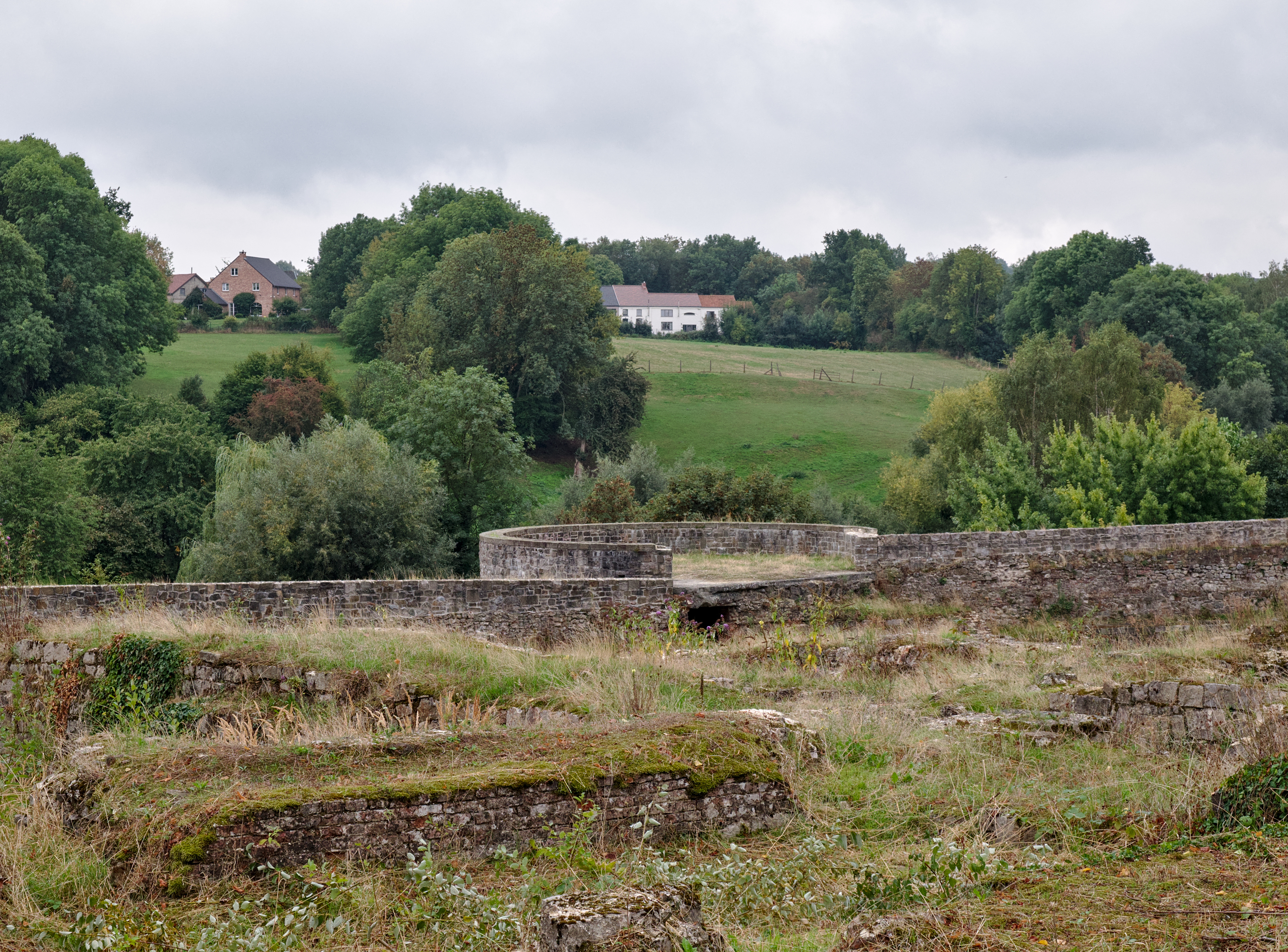
Plateau on top of the city walls with some wall remains of the palace

== Bibliography ==
- Samuel Glot: "De Marie de Hongrie aux Gilles de Binche. Une double réalité, historique et mythique" in Les Cahiers Binchois Volume 13 (1995)
- Jacqueline Kerkhoff: "Maria van Hongarije en haar hof 1505-1558: tot plichtsbetrachting uitverkoren", Uitgeverij Verloren, Hilversum (2008)
- Rutger Tijs: "Renaissance- en barokarchitectuur in België: Vitruvius' erfenis en de ontwikkeling van de bouwkunst in de Zuidelijke Nederlanden van renaissance tot barok", Lannoo Uitgeverij (1999)
- L. Huguet: "Le château de Binche", Tournai, Malo et Levasseur, 1868.
- Essai de reconstitution de l’ancien castrum des Comtes de Hainaut (Aquarelle de l’architecte E. Devreux, in Binche : son histoire par les monuments, E. Piret, NM, p8)
- Essai de reconstitution du palais de Marie de Hongrie (Aquarelle de l’architecte E. Devreux, in Binche : son histoire par les monuments, E. Piret, NM, p12)
- Essai de reconstruction du château au XVIème siècle (Etudes archéologiques sur le palais de Marie de Hongrie par E. Devreux en juin 1926, in Binche au fil de l’Histoire, F. Ansion, Binche, lucpireéditions, 2014, p23)
