= Château de Folembray =

Former royal palace in France

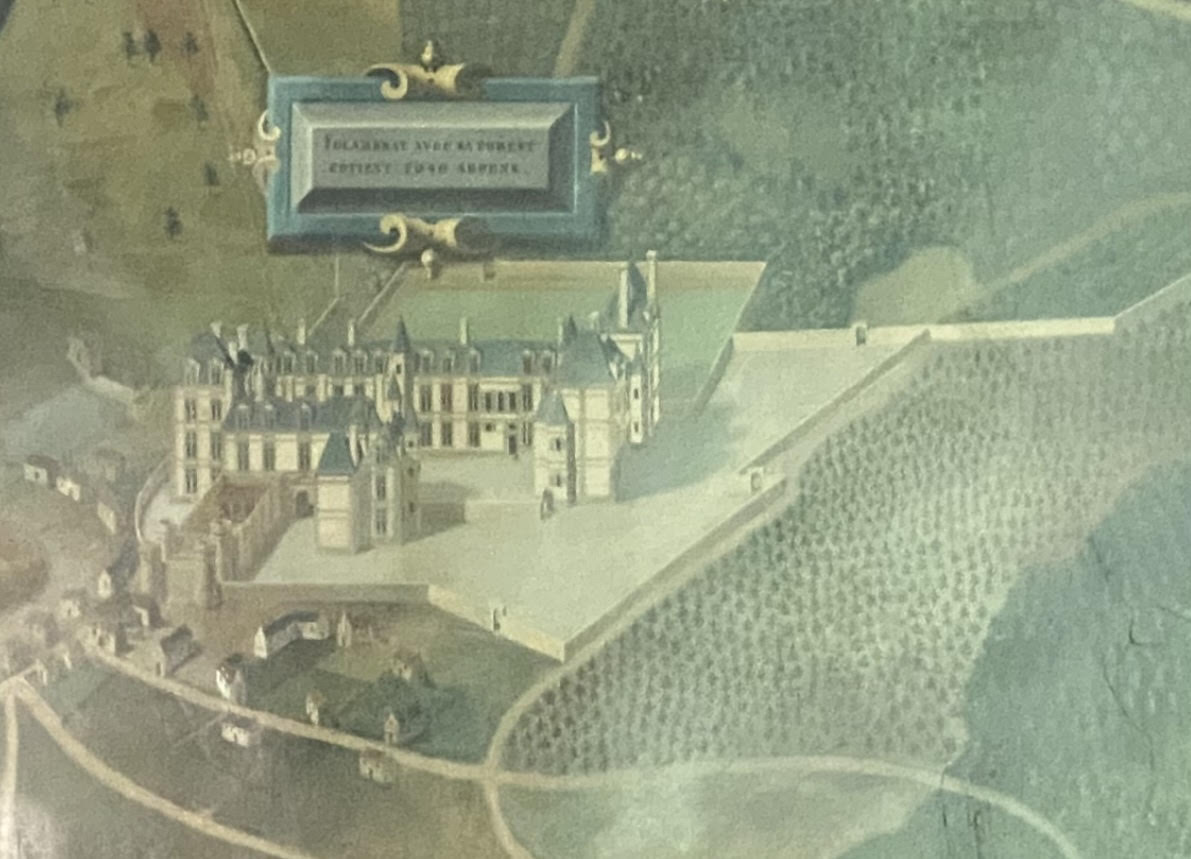
The château de Folembray in the Galerie des Cerfs in the Palace of Fontainebleau

The Folembray Palace (French: Château de Folembray) was located in the village of Folembray in northern France. Constructed in renaissance style, the château was part of the royal domains, and a favorite hunting lodge of the French kings. Demolished in the 17th century, nothing remains anymore of this palace.

== History ==
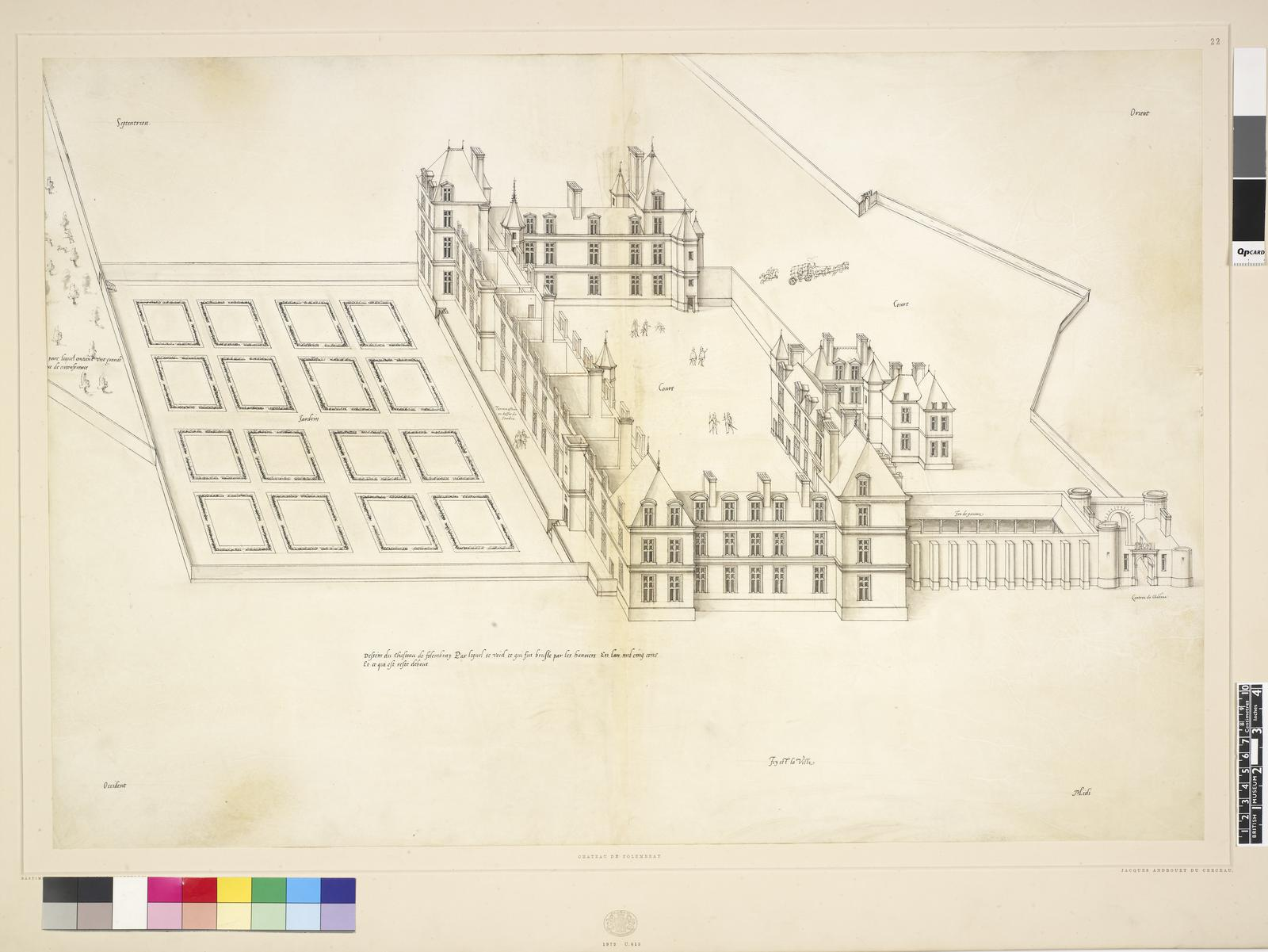
The château de Folembray by Jacques I Androuet du Cerceau (1570s)

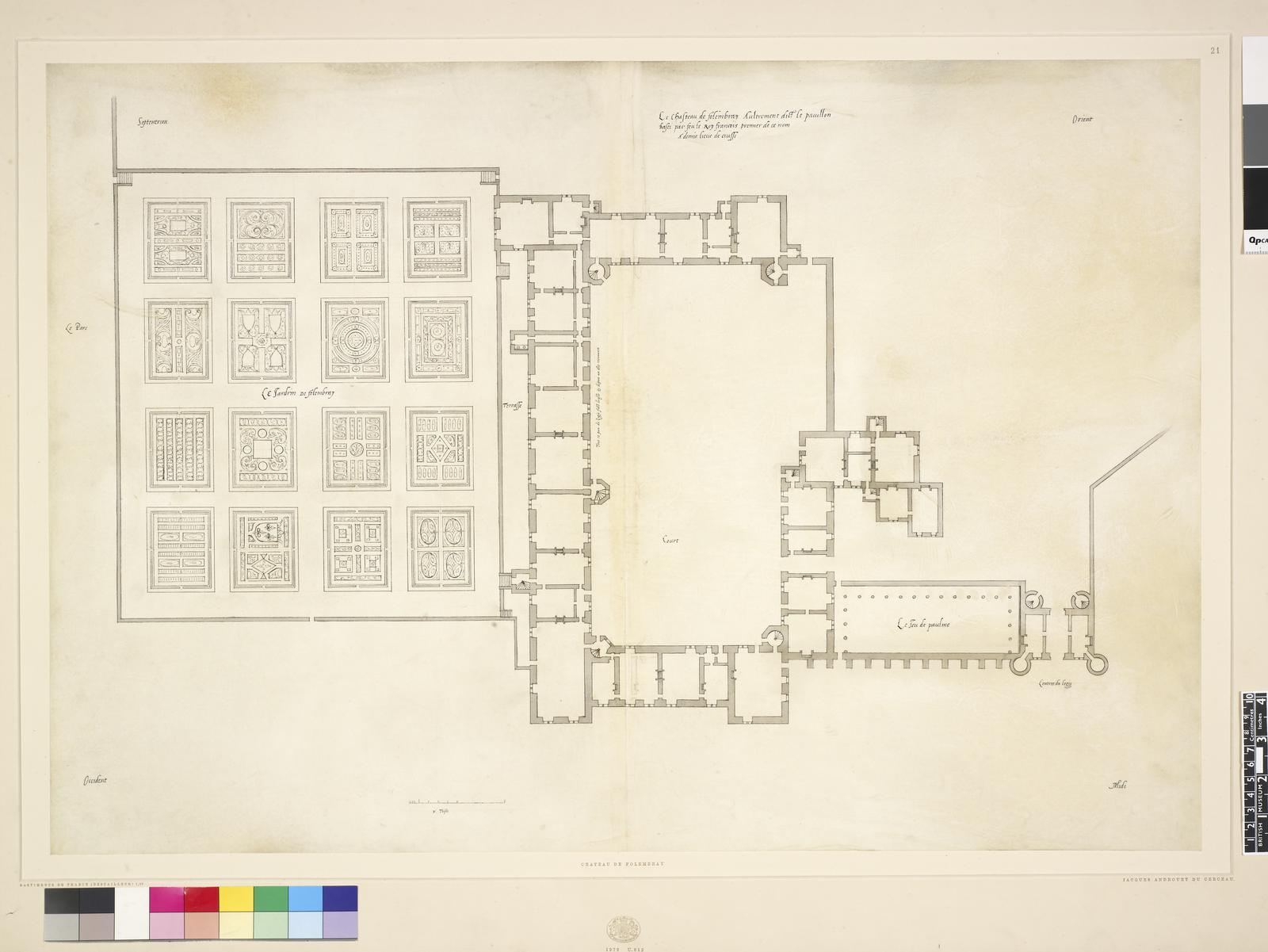
Plan of the château de Folembray by Jacques I Androuet du Cerceau (1576)

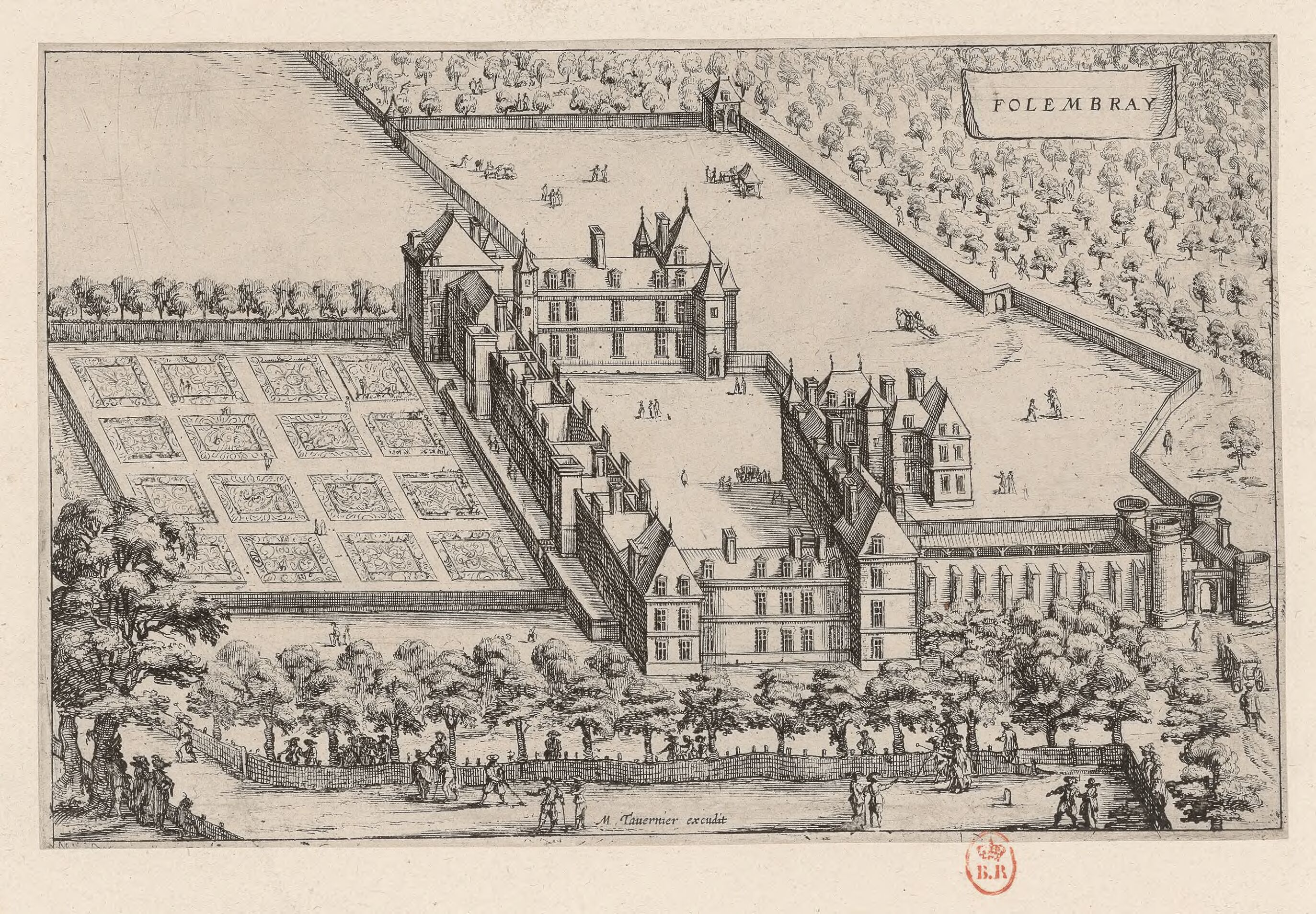
The château de Folembray by François Langlois (1626)

At the start of the 13th century, Enguerrand III, lord of Coucy, built a fortified castle in Folembray in 1209. It was located in the highest part of the village, and had four towers. In the 16th century, this castle was razed. King Francis I of France (1494–1547) had it replaced by a renaissance palace.

The renaissance château was designed by Pierre Tacheron. Construction started around 1538 and was completed in 1543. Additions were added by Jean Lemoisne between 1546 and 1547. The palace became a favorite hunting lodge of the king. Also his son, king Henry II (1547–1559) loved to come here to hunt and spent quality time with his mistress, Diane de Poitiers (1500–1566).

During the Franco-Spanish wars, the Imperial army of Holy Roman Emperor Charles V under the command of Adriaan van Croÿ, 1st Count of Roeulx, entered Picardy in the spring of 1554, and ravaged the country up to 70 km from Paris. They set the château on fire, which destroyed most of the palace. However, the French troops counterattacked. On 21 July, they raided the palaces of Binche and Mariemont, residences of the Charles V's sister, queen Mary of Hungary, governor of the Habsburg Netherlands. The palaces were set on fire in retaliation. Henry lit the fire himself and had a placard affixed to the ruins: "Queen of folly, remember Folembray!"

Henry II, nevertheless, returned to Folembray and had the palace restored. His son, Henry III (1551–1589) presented the château to his (illegitimate) half-sister, Diane Duchess of Angoulême (1538–1619). When she passed aways without heirs, the estate returned to the French crown.

It was a favorite royal residence again under Henry IV of France (1553–1610), who liked to hunt here. Also, he spent quality time here with his mistress and confidante, Gabrielle d'Estrées (1573–1599). Further, in January 1596, the Edict of Folembray was signed at the château, a peace treaty between Henri IV and Charles, Duke of Mayenne (1554–1611), a leader of the Catholic League. As a result, the duke of Mayenne submitted to the French king and retained Chalons, Seurre and Soissons for six years.

After Henry IV, the kings no longer use Folembray as a royal residence. Multiple ravaged by passing armies between 1649 and 1653, the palace is demolished in 1672 during the reign of Louis XIV (1638–1715). Today, nothing remains anymore of the palace.

== Architecture ==
The château of Folembray was similar in design to the Château de Villers-Cotterêts. It had a very elongated courtyard as well, lined with plain buildings and rectangular pavilions. Today, the palace can only be admired from engravings, such as those made by Jacques I Androuet du Cerceau or the depiction of the château on the fresco maps in the Galerie des Cerfs of the Palace of Fontainebleau.

== Literature ==
- Abbe Vernier (1872). L'Histoire de Folembray (in French).
- Babelon, Jean-Pierre (1989). Châteaux de France au siècle de la Renaissance (in French). Paris: Flammarion/ Picard. p. 716. ISBN 978-2080120625.
