= Coucy-la-Ville =

- Commune
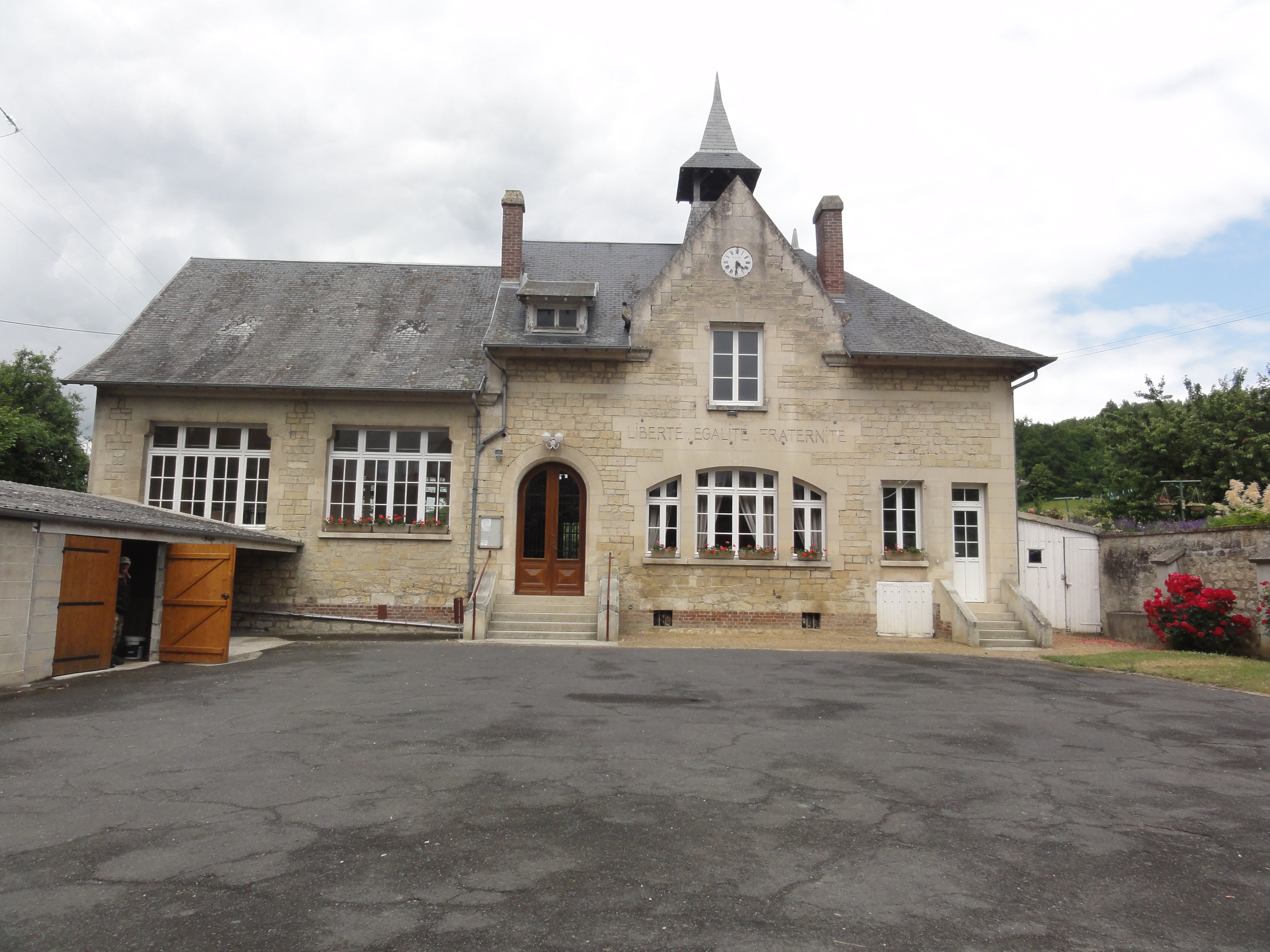
- The town hall of Coucy-la-Ville

- Coat of arms
- Location of Coucy-la-Ville
- Location within France Location within Hauts-de-France
- Coordinates: 49°32′02″N 3°19′49″E
- Country: France
- Region: Hauts-de-France
- Department: Aisne
- Arrondissement: Laon
- Canton: Vic-sur-Aisne

Government
  - Mayor (2026–32): Maximino De Sousa
- Area^{1}: 6.11 km^{2} (2.36 sq mi)
- Elevation: 80 m (260 ft)
- Highest elevation: 175 m (574 ft)
- Lowest elevation: 62 m (203 ft)
- Population (2023): 194
  - Density: 31.8/km^{2} (82.2/sq mi)
- Time zone: UTC+01:00 (CET)
  - Summer (DST): UTC+02:00 (CEST)
- INSEE/Postal code: 02219 /02380
- ^{1} French Land Register data, which excludes lakes, ponds, glaciers > 1 km^{2} (0.386 sq mi or 247 acres) and river estuaries.

Coucy-la-Ville (French pronunciation: [kusi la vil]) is a commune in the Aisne department in Hauts-de-France in northern France.

On the main Chauny to Soissons road, shortly after the village of Folembray, take a right hand turn and within half a mile you will come to the village of Coucy-la-Ville.

A single road runs through this small village passing a farm, a cafe-bar and a church. Then, as suddenly as you entered, you have left this small place. Up on the hill to your right you will see the remarkable view of the remains of the Château de Coucy, located in Coucy-le-Château-Auffrique. Down in Coucy-la-Ville, the area is flat and agricultural with its few houses dotted on either side of the road.

== Administration ==
List of mayors
Term	Name
2001–2014	Robert Lalain
2014–incumbent	Maximino De Sousa

== Population ==
Historical population
Year	Pop.	±% p.a.
1968	188	—
1975	208	+1.45%
1982	196	−0.85%
1990	189	−0.45%
1999	176	−0.79%
2007	191	+1.03%
2012	216	+2.49%
2017	219	+0.28%
2023	194	−2.00%
Source: INSEE

== See also ==
- Communes of the Aisne department
