= Folembray =

- Commune
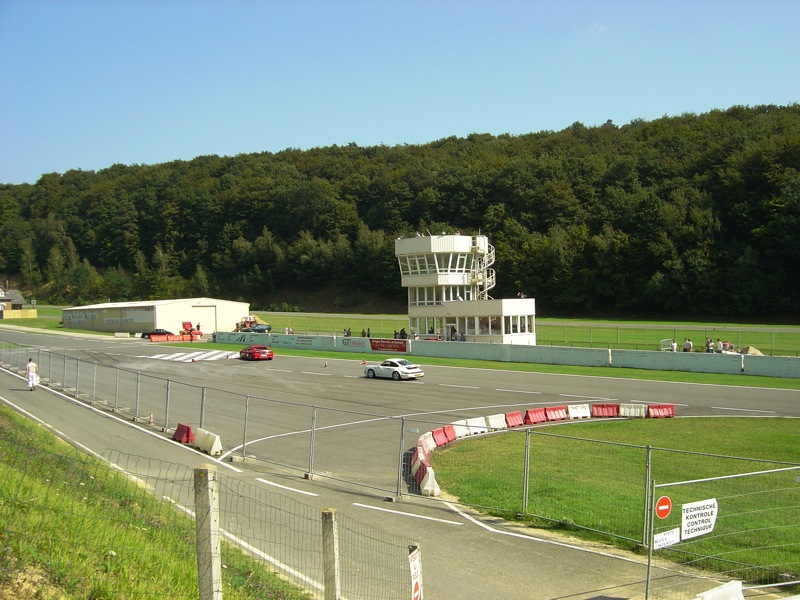
- Racetrack

- Coat of arms
- Location of Folembray
- Location within France Location within Hauts-de-France
- Coordinates: 49°32′33″N 3°17′23″E
- Country: France
- Region: Hauts-de-France
- Department: Aisne
- Arrondissement: Laon
- Canton: Vic-sur-Aisne

Government
  - Mayor (2026–32): Pascal Foret
- Area^{1}: 8.85 km^{2} (3.42 sq mi)
- Elevation: 215 m (705 ft)
- Highest elevation: 152 m (499 ft)
- Lowest elevation: 49 m (161 ft)
- Population (2023): 1,355
  - Density: 153/km^{2} (397/sq mi)
- Time zone: UTC+01:00 (CET)
  - Summer (DST): UTC+02:00 (CEST)
- INSEE/Postal code: 02318 /02670
- ^{1} French Land Register data, which excludes lakes, ponds, glaciers > 1 km^{2} (0.386 sq mi or 247 acres) and river estuaries.

Folembray (French pronunciation: [fɔlɑ̃bʁɛ]) is a commune in the Aisne department in Hauts-de-France in northern France. During the 16th and 17th century, it was the location of French royal residence, the Château de Folembray, of which nothings remains anymore.

== Population ==
Historical population
Year	Pop.	±% p.a.
1968	1,497	—
1975	1,368	−1.28%
1982	1,389	+0.22%
1990	1,421	+0.29%
1999	1,490	+0.53%
2007	1,535	+0.37%
2012	1,428	−1.43%
2017	1,386	−0.60%
2023	1,355	−0.38%
Source: INSEE

== See also ==
- Communes of the Aisne department
