= Carnival of Nivelles =

Annual event in Nivelles, Belgium

Carnival of Nivelles Carnaval de Nivelles
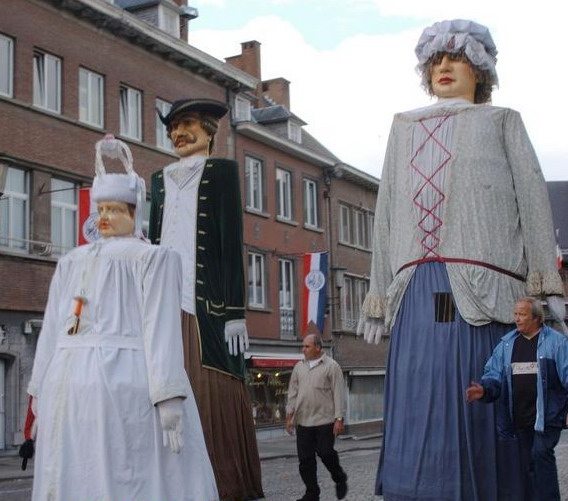
- Nivelles Carnival giants
- Status: Active
- Frequency: Annual
- Location: Nivelles
- Country: Belgium

The Carnival of Nivelles (French: Carnaval de Nivelles) is an annual festival held in Nivelles, Walloon Brabant, Belgium. The parade takes place yearly on the weekend of Quadragesima Sunday. It lasts four days, starting the first Saturday of Lent and ending the following Tuesday.

The carnival is one of the most important in Belgium and the oldest in the province of Walloon Brabant. It welcomes a lot of floats, traditional groups, majorettes, fanfares and processional giants. The carnival is mainly famous for its societies of Gilles (men dressed in high, plumed hats and bright costumes) and its imaginative societies, which attract crowds as in the nearby Centre region of Hainaut (Binchois type of carnival).

== History ==
The Carnival of Nivelles started before the 1900s. It initially took place around Laetare Sunday and later moved to the first weekend of Lent. It is not known exactly when Gilles made their first appearance (around 1910).

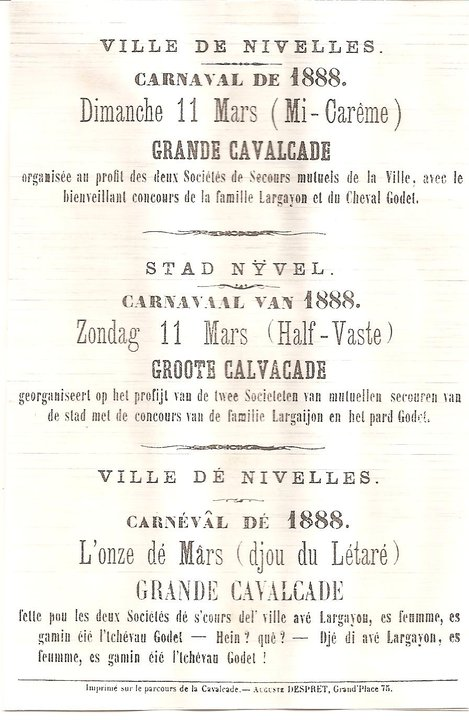
Flyer about the carnival (1888)

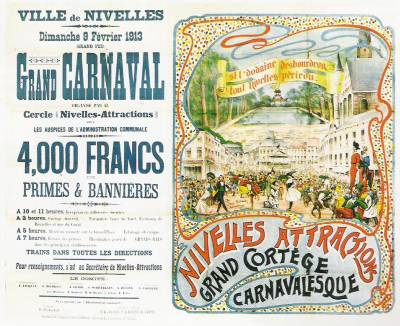
Flyer about the carnival (1913)
