= Nivelles =

City in Walloon Brabant province, Wallonia, Belgium

Nivelles: Nivele (Walloon); Nijvel (Dutch)
- Municipality
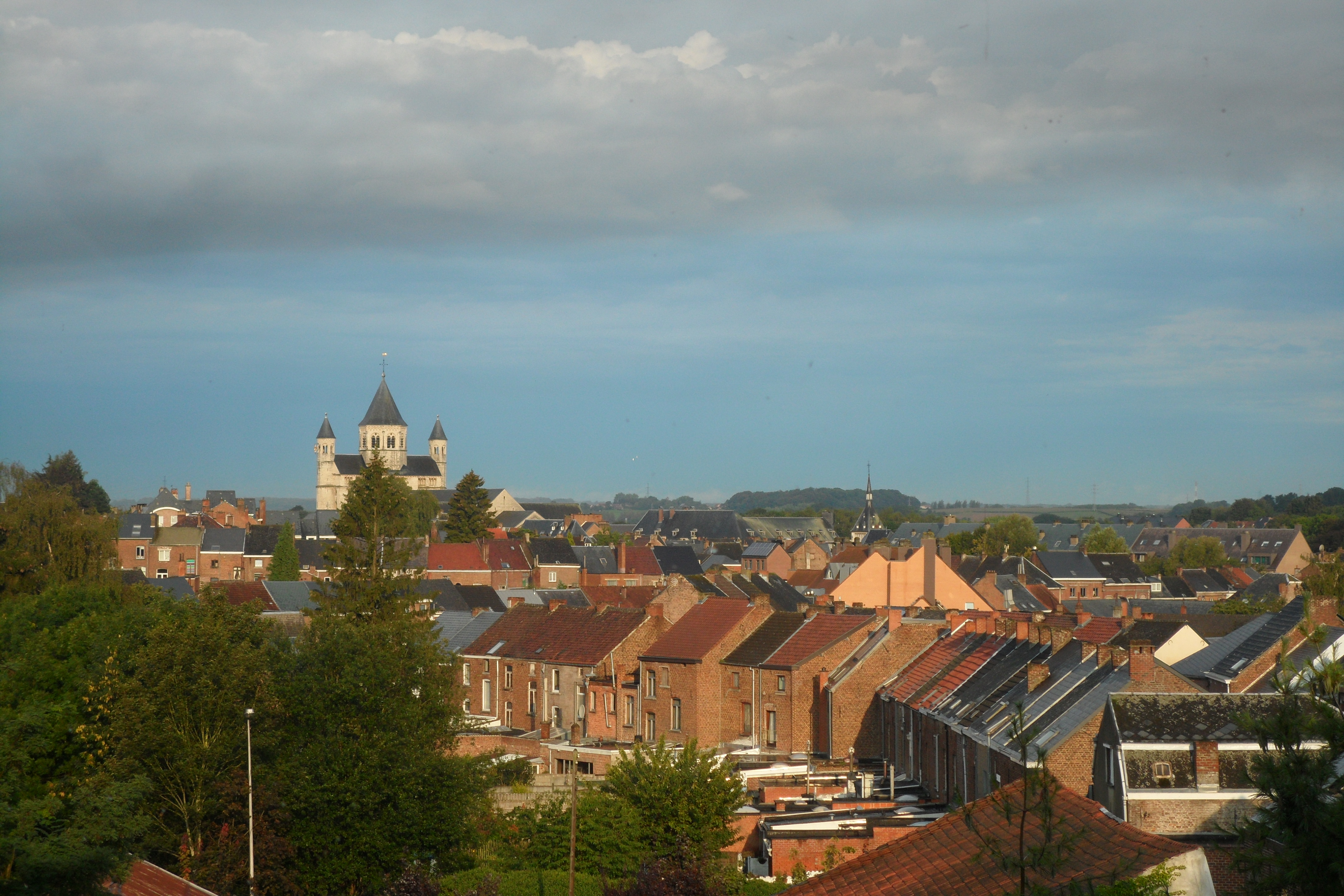

- Flag Coat of arms

- Location of Nivelles in Walloon Brabant
- Interactive map of Nivelles
- Location in Belgium
- Coordinates: 50°35′N 04°19′E
- Country: Belgium
- Community: French Community
- Region: Wallonia
- Province: Walloon Brabant
- Arrondissement: Nivelles

Government
  - Mayor: Bernard De Ro; Les Engagés
  - Governing party: LE - PS - Ecolo

Area
  - Total: 60.83 km^{2} (23.49 sq mi)

Population (2018-01-01)
  - Total: 28,521
  - Density: 468.9/km^{2} (1,214/sq mi)
- Postal codes: 1400, 1401, 1402, 1404
- NIS code: 25072
- Area codes: 067
- Website: www.nivelles.be

Nivelles (French: [nivɛl]; Dutch: Nijvel [ˈnɛivəl]; Walloon: Nivele) is a city and municipality of Wallonia located in the Belgian province of Walloon Brabant. The Nivelles municipality includes the former municipalities of Baulers, Bornival, Thines, and Monstreux.

The Nivelles arrondissement includes all the municipalities in Walloon Brabant.

The Collegiate Church of St. Gertrude has been classified as a heritage site of Wallonia.

== History ==
=== The rise of Nivelles ===
Starting in 4,000 BC, the Nivelles region was gradually turned into agricultural land by the Danubian settlers. Most of their ancestral Rubanean civilization was destroyed by the Roman invaders during the first century AD. In turn, most of the Roman constructions, including villas, were destroyed during the Germanic invasions of the 3rd century.

In the 7th century, the territory was part of the Austrasian Frankish kingdom, and the Mayor of the Palace, Pippin of Landen, rebuilt a villa there that covered more than 78 km². After Pippin's death in 640, the bishop of Maastricht, the future Saint Amand, urged Pippin's widow, Itta, to found an abbey in their villa. Itta's daughter, Gertrude, became the monastery's first abbess and was venerated as a saint upon her death. The growing influx of pilgrims necessitated the construction of ever-bigger churches, which culminated in the huge Romanesque structure that still stands today. The dedication of the church took place in 1046 in the presence of Wazo, Prince-Bishop of Liège, and Henry III, Holy Roman Emperor. This was the golden age of the Nivelles monastery, which now owned territories as far as Friesland, the Moselle and the Rhine.

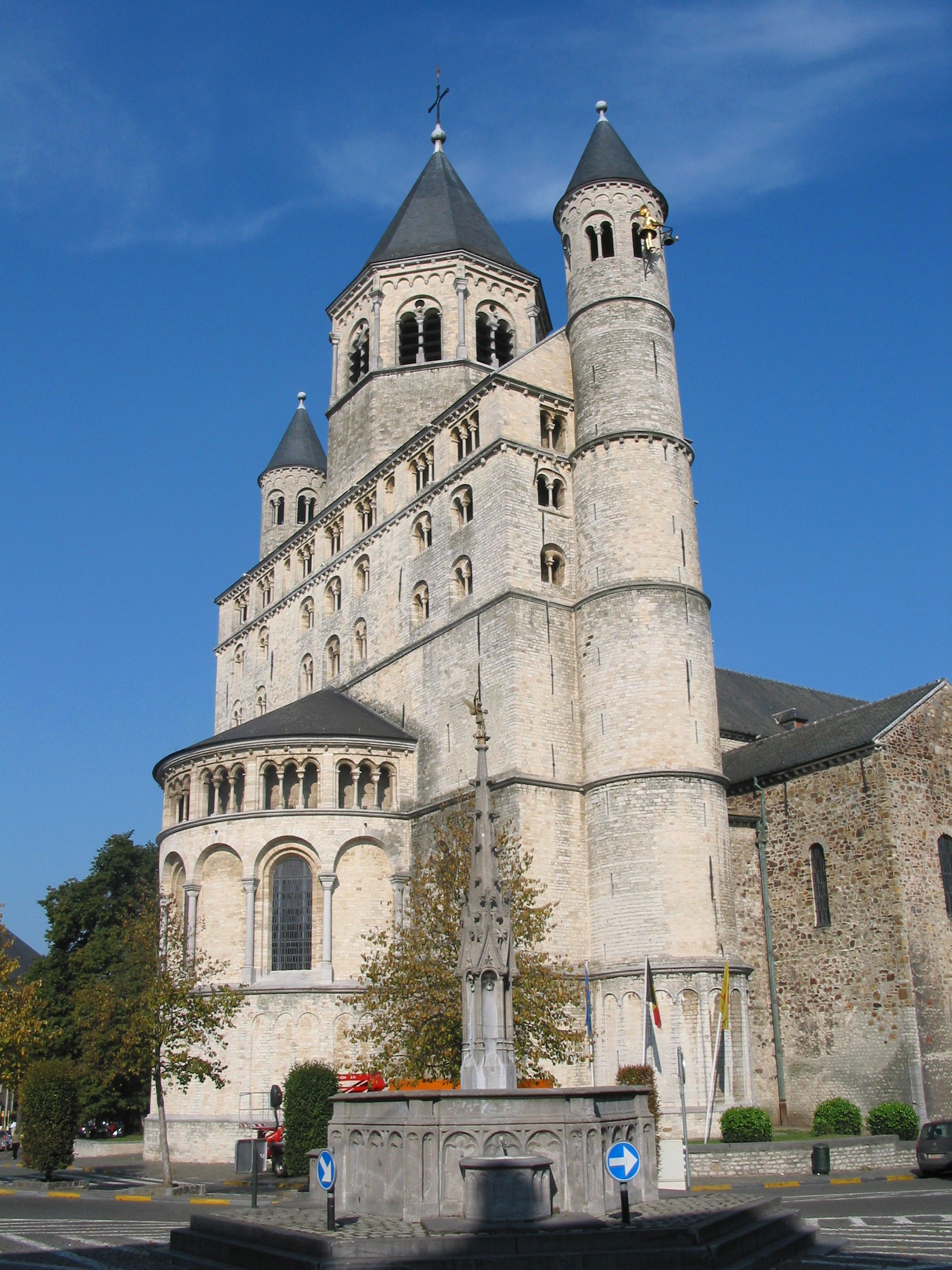
Collegiate Church of St. Gertrude

=== 13th century to 1830 ===
In the 13th century, the city that grew around the church became part of the Duchy of Brabant. The population was mainly artisans and guild members, who did not hesitate to fight the abbesses and the dukes to obtain their rights. These rights were finally granted by Joanna, Duchess of Brabant in the 14th century. In 1647, an important uprising by the thread manufacturers resulted in many of the city's entrepreneurs leaving for France, leading to the city's economic decline. The wars of the 17th century between France and the Spanish Netherlands made the situation worse as Nivelles went through successive sieges and military occupations. The Austrian and French regimes of the 18th century brought religious and administrative reforms to the city.

=== 1830 to the present day ===
In 1830, Nivelles was one of the first cities to send patriotic troops to Brussels to fight in the Belgian Revolution. The following years were marked by the growth of heavy industry, including metallurgy and railway construction. The bombing of the city during World War I brought some damage to buildings, but greater devastation occurred during World War II on 14 May 1940, when almost the entire city centre was destroyed, leaving only the walls of the collegiate church standing. The rebuilding of the church was completed in 1984, but remains can be seen of wall fragments on the south side of the collegiate.

== Main sights ==
- The Collegiate Church of St. Gertrude, patron saint of the city, dates from the 11th to the 13th century and is one of the best examples of Romanesque style in Belgium. It has been classified as one of Europe's major heritage sites. Tombs from the Merovingian (7th century) and Carolingian (9th century) periods have been found under the church. The Romanesque crypt is one of the largest of its kind in Europe.
- The two-meter-tall statue that strikes the hours in one of the towers (French: jacquemart) is affectionately known as "Jean de Nivelles". Jean dates from around 1400.
- The Recollets convent and its church date from the 16th century.
- Nivelles also has an archaeological museum, which complements the visit at Saint Gertrude.
- The "Dodaine" park provides a welcome green space on the southern side of the town.
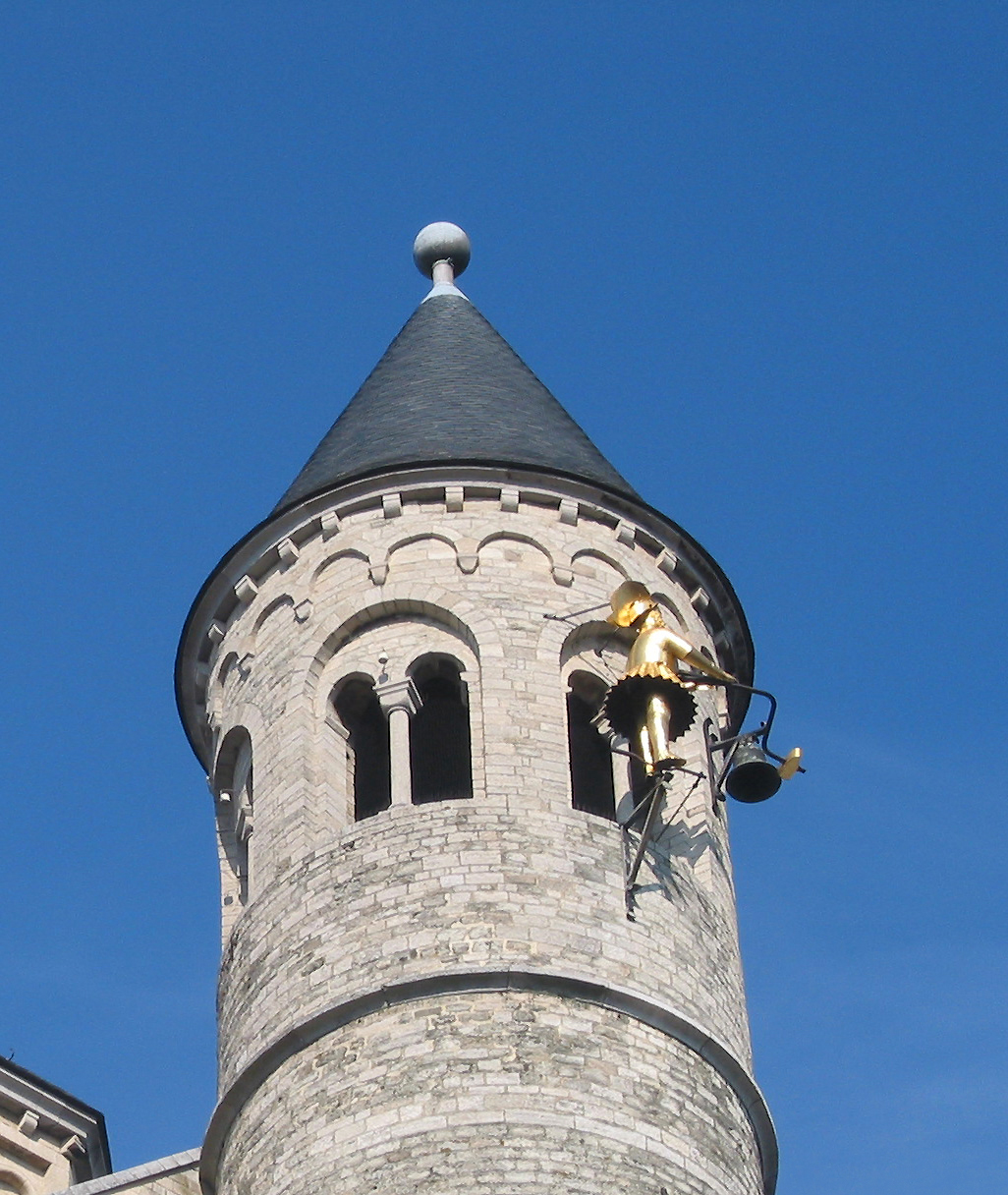
Jean de Nivelles

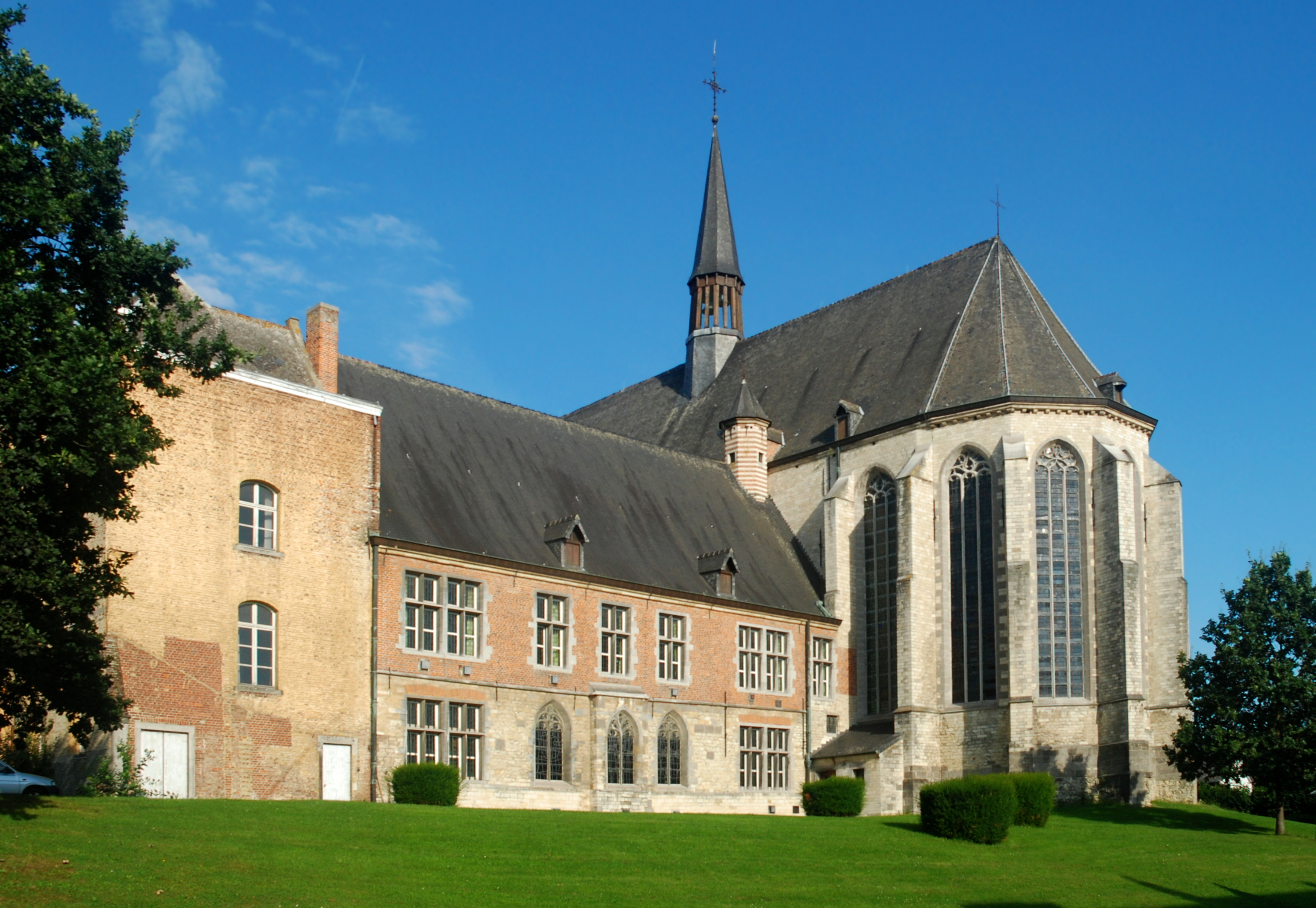
Recollect convent

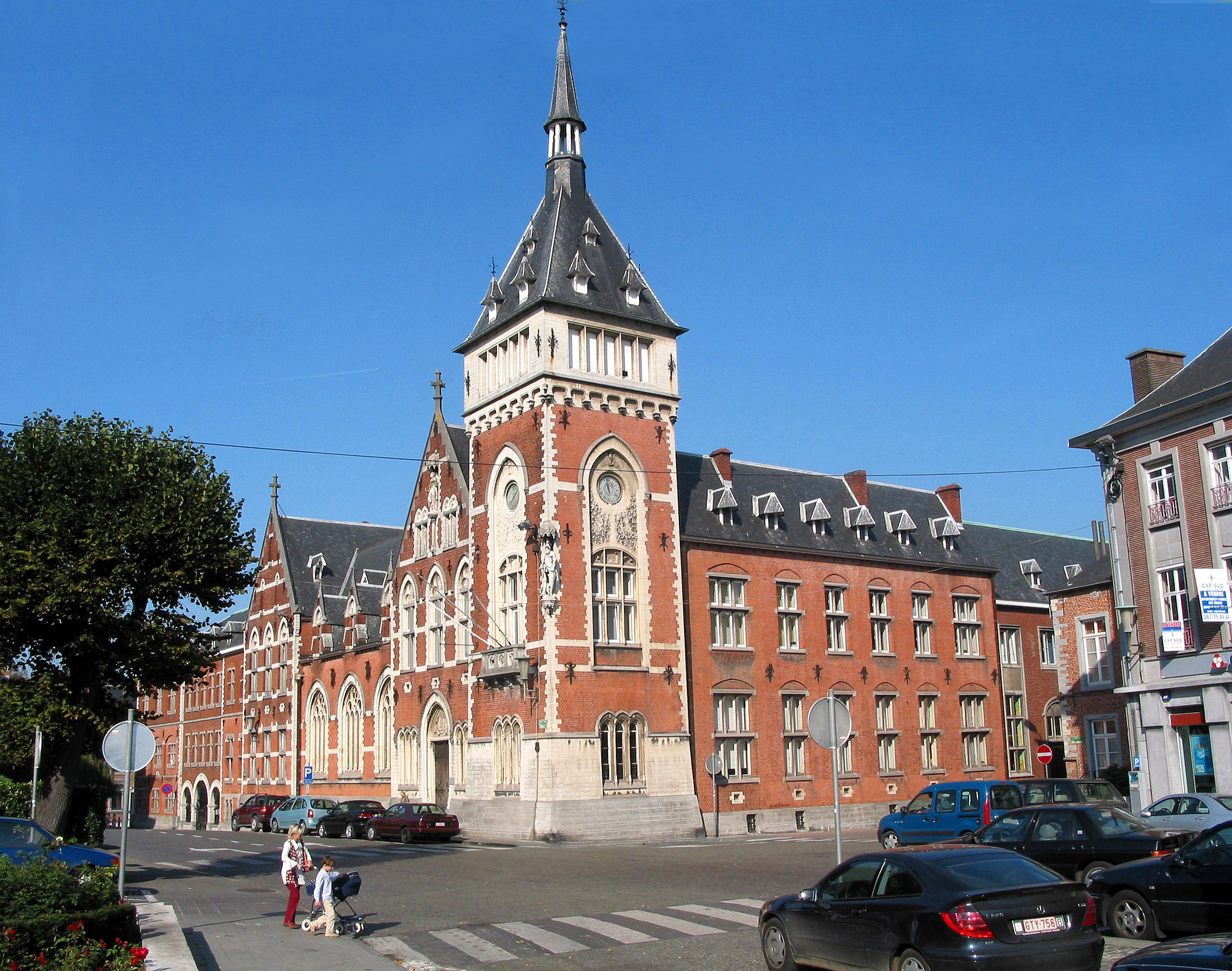
Palace of Justice

== Folklore ==
- Like Ath, Nivelles boasts a collection of processional giants, one of which, Goliath, dates from 1365. The Goliath family (husband, wife and son) is usually accompanied by an odd collection of giant animals, including a lion, a camel, a unicorn, and a dragon.
- Originating in the 13th century, the well-attended Saint-Gertrude religious procession is held annually.
- The Nivelles Carnival is more recent (19th century) and takes place on the first weekend of Lent. Like the Binche Carnival, that of Nivelles includes the famous Gilles.
- The city's gastronomic specialty is the tarte al d'jote, a type of quiche including local cheese, onions, greens, eggs and butter.
- Nivelles is also known for its 49-bell carillon and its four named canons.

== Sports ==
In 1972 and 1974, the Belgian Grand Prix was hosted at the Nivelles-Baulers circuit. Emerson Fittipaldi won the race both times. The circuit ultimately proved unpopular and has since been demolished.

In September 2007, Nivelles jointly hosted the VII European Handball Championship of Ballpelote, International fronton and International game with Buizingen.

== Famous inhabitants ==
- St Wilfretrudis of Nivelles – Abbess and niece of Gertrude (7th century)
- Pippin of Landen, Mayor of the Palace of Austrasia under the Merovingian kings (7th century)
- Gertrude of Nivelles, Pippin's daughter and abbess of the Nivelles monastery (626–659)
- Johann Tserclaes, Holy Roman Empire general in the Thirty Years' War (1559–1632)
- Louis-Joseph Seutin, doctor and surgeon (1793–1862)
- Jules Louis Guillery, lawyer and politician (1824–1902)
- Henri Delmotte, novelist (1822–1884)
- Didier Theys, racing driver (b. 1956)
- André Lotterer, racing driver (b. 1981)
- Ange de Nivelles, Capuchin friar in the 1600s

== Twin city ==
- France: Saintes

== See also ==
- Brabant killers
