= Triage-Lavoir de Péronnes =

Triage-Lavoir of Péronnes
- Triage-Lavoir de Péronnes
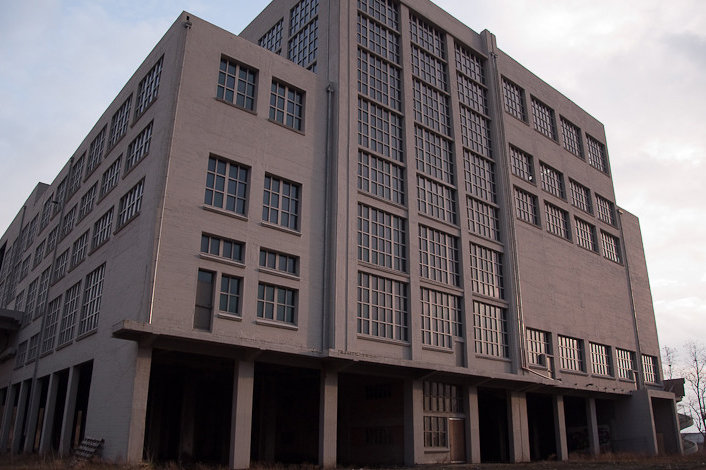
- The partly renovated coal washing facility of Péronnes-lez-Binche (March 20, 2010)

- Location within Belgium

General information
- Type: Industrial
- Location: Péronnes-lez-Binche, Binche, Hainaut, Belgium, rue des Mineurs 31, Binche, Belgium
- Coordinates: 50°25′39″N 4°10′18″E
- Construction started: 1954
- Completed: 1954
- Renovated: 2005 - present
- Renovation cost: 20 million euros
- Owner: SA Triage Lavoir du Centre (including the companies IDEA, IMMOCITA, IPW, SPAQuE, TPF)

Height
- Height: 40 m (130 ft)

Technical details
- Floor area: 20,000 m^{2} (220,000 sq ft)

Triage-Lavoir de Péronnes (French pronunciation: [tʁijaʒ lavwaʁ də peʁɔn]) is a former coal washing facility that was built with the help of the Marshall Plan in 1954. It was built for the demand of the coal industry to process the coal coming from the mines of Péronnes, Ressaix and Trivières. It was capable processing over 3,000 tons of coal daily. In 1969 the nearby coal mines in Saint-Albert and Sint-Margriete were closed, which caused Triage-Lavoir to become useless, and it was closed down after only 15 years of active operation. Immediately after closing the facility, all the machines and equipment were removed and the facility stayed abandoned for over 3 decades.

The building was under threat of demolition in 2000 but on May 15, 2003, it was classified as a monument to be saved.

Currently the building is under renovation financed by the European Union and the Walloon Region through the Marshall Plan of Wallonia program. The renovation started in September 2005. The renovation of the exterior of the building was scheduled to be finished by September 2006. The budget for the walls was 2.1 million euros. In spring 2010, the renovation work was still in progress. The exterior and a small fraction of the ground floor has been rebuilt. Certain parts of the old building will be left untouched, other than cleaning and careful restoring, in order to preserve the building's unique architectural elements. Inside the back of the building, half buried in the ground, new storage rooms will be built for the companies to use.

The renovated building is supposed host several organisations, including The General Archives of the Royalty (intermediate centre of archives), Royal Institute of Natural Sciences of Belgium (stores coal and fossil core-samples), the IFAPME (center of professional development: contemporary artwork, design) and some private offices.

== In music ==
- Triage-Lavoir de Péronnes appears on the music video of À contre-courant, of Alizée. The music video was filmed inside the building and shows the two main actors running around in it. Also some exterior scenes were used.
