= List of protected heritage sites in Binche =

This table shows an overview of the protected heritage sites in the Walloon town Binche. This list is part of Belgium's national heritage.

| Object | Year/architect | Town/section | Address | Coordinates | Number^{?} | Image |
|---|---|---|---|---|---|---|
| Old walls of Binche ^{(nl)} ^{(fr)} | | Binche | | 50.414880°N 4.168351°E | 56011-CLT-0001-01 Info | Oude wallen van Binche |
| Building called "Maison Bette", has become a haven for former Abbey of Good Hope, called "Caves Bettes" ^{(nl)} ^{(fr)} | | Binche | rue des Promenades | 50.409103°N 4.166264°E | 56011-CLT-0003-01 Info | Gebouw genaamd "Maison Bette", uitgegroeid tot een toevluchtsoord voor voormalige abdij van Goede Hoop, de zogenaamde "Caves Bettes" |
| Ruins of castle Marie de Hongrie, municipal park ^{(nl)} ^{(fr)} | | Binche | | 50.408367°N 4.164737°E | 56011-CLT-0005-01 Info | Ruïnes van kasteel Marie de Hongrie, sectionlijk park |
| Chapel of the old cemetery ^{(nl)} ^{(fr)} | | Binche | rue Haute | 50.409130°N 4.164154°E | 56011-CLT-0006-01 Info | Kapel van de oude begraafplaats |
| town hall ^{(nl)} ^{(fr)} | | Binche | Grand Place | 50.410657°N 4.165580°E | 56011-CLT-0007-01 Info | Raadhuis |
| Chapel of Sainte-Anne Nies surplus ^{(nl)} ^{(fr)} | | Binche | rue Z. Fontaine | 50.417254°N 4.169172°E | 56011-CLT-0008-01 Info | Kapel Sainte-Anne van Batignies |
| Church of Saint-Ursmer ^{(nl)} ^{(fr)} | | Binche | | 50.409033°N 4.165087°E | 56011-CLT-0009-01 Info | Kerk Saint-Ursmer |
| The buildings formerly used by the Royal Athenaeum (now the Museum of Carnival and Mask (formerly the Augustinian College)) ^{(nl)} ^{(fr)} | | Binche | rue de l'église n°16 | 50.409444°N 4.166053°E | 56011-CLT-0011-01 Info | De gebouwen vroeger benut door het Koninklijk Atheneum (nu het Museum van Carnaval en het Masker (voorheen de Augustijner College)) |
| Castle Prisches and the ensemble of the castle and its immediate surroundings ^{(nl)} ^{(fr)} | | Binche | rue de Prisches n°s 7-8 | 50.405595°N 4.187390°E | 56011-CLT-0013-01 Info | |
| House: main facade and front roof ^{(nl)} ^{(fr)} | | Binche | rue de Mons n°7 | 50.412506°N 4.165561°E | 56011-CLT-0014-01 Info | |
| Church Sainte-Elisabeth ^{(nl)} ^{(fr)} | | Binche | | 50.412515°N 4.167026°E | 56011-CLT-0015-01 Info | Kerk Sainte-Elisabeth |
| Palace of Justice ^{(nl)} ^{(fr)} | | avenue Albert Ier, n°56 Binche | | 50.412934°N 4.166198°E | 56011-CLT-0016-01 Info | Justitieel Paleis |
| Station Square Eugene Derbaix ^{(nl)} ^{(fr)} | | Binche | | 50.409108°N 4.171814°E | 56011-CLT-0017-01 Info | Station en plein Eugène Derbaix |
| Former nursing home, currently administrative center (facades and roofs) and environment ^{(nl)} ^{(fr)} | | Binche | rue Saint-Paul n°14 | 50.409924°N 4.166570°E | 56011-CLT-0018-01 Info | Voormalige verpleeghuis, op dit moment administratief centrum (gevels en daken) en omgeving |
| Sainte-Marie ^{(nl)} ^{(fr)} | | Binche | | 50.435815°N 4.145424°E | 56011-CLT-0019-01 Info | |
| Sainte-Marie-Madeleine ^{(nl)} ^{(fr)} | | Binche | | 50.403416°N 4.204346°E | 56011-CLT-0022-01 Info | Kerk Sainte-Marie-Madeleine |
| Windmill "Moulin Stocklet" and its surroundings ^{(nl)} ^{(fr)} | | Binche | | 50.422666°N 4.229020°E | 56011-CLT-0023-01 Info | |
| Mill Stocket and existing mechanism ^{(nl)} ^{(fr)} | | Binche | | 50.422698°N 4.230102°E | 56011-CLT-0024-01 Info | |
| Old quarries Hubaut ^{(nl)} ^{(fr)} | | Binche | | 50.409456°N 4.159077°E | 56011-CLT-0025-01 Info | |
| Archaeological site Vodgoriacum ^{(nl)} ^{(fr)} | | Binche | | 50.417841°N 4.144313°E | 56011-CLT-0026-01 Info | |
| Of the old colliery spoil heaps of Courte (No. 160, "Fosse No. 1 Est", n ° 161, "Lavoir-Ressaix 's 162 et n ° 163" Leval ") ^{(nl)} ^{(fr)} | | Binche | | 50.418461°N 4.198503°E | 56011-CLT-0027-01 Info | |
| Certain parts of the sorting and washing "Lavoir du Centre" ^{(nl)} ^{(fr)} | | Binche | rue des Mineurs 31 | 50.427604°N 4.172587°E | 56011-CLT-0030-01 Info | |
| Pharmacy Milet: street facade and roof ^{(nl)} ^{(fr)} | | Binche | | 50.411890°N 4.165440°E | 56011-CLT-0034-01 Info | |
| Possible classification of the church of Notre-Dame du Travail, and establishing a protection zone exists around the Place du Levant ^{(nl)} ^{(fr)} | | Binche | place du Levant van Mons naar Bray | 50.43136°N 4.06734°E | 56011-CLT-0035-01 Info | |
| Old walls of Binche ^{(nl)} ^{(fr)} | | Binche | | 50.414880°N 4.168351°E | 56011-PEX-0001-01 Info | Oude wallen van Binche |
| Town hall ^{(nl)} ^{(fr)} | | Binche | | 50.410657°N 4.165580°E | 56011-PEX-0002-01 Info | |

== See also ==
- List of protected heritage sites in Hainaut (province)
- Binche
