= Fortsas hoax =

1840 hoax in Binche, Belgium

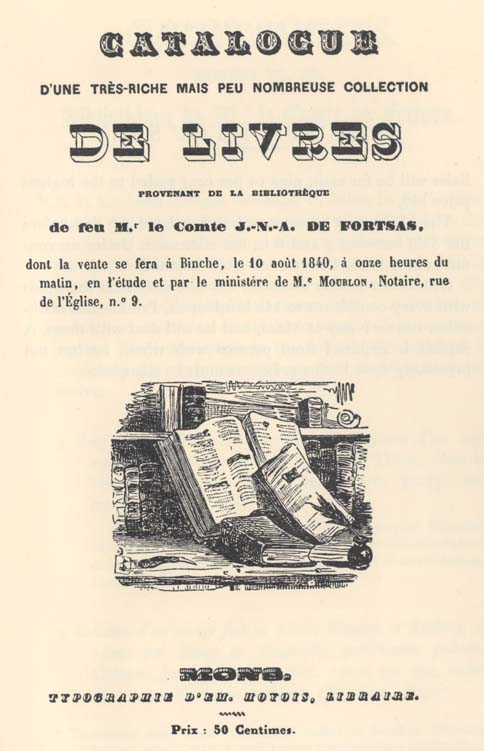
Front cover of the Fortsas Catalogue

The Fortsas hoax refers to an incident in Binche, Belgium, in 1840. That year, booksellers, intellectuals, librarians, and collectors of rare books throughout Europe received a catalogue describing a collection of rare books to be auctioned.

According to the message, "Jean Nepomucene Auguste Pichauld, Comte de Fortsas", had been a collector of unique books – books of which only one copy was known to exist. When he had died, on September 1, 1839, he had possessed 52 such books. His heirs, not interested in collecting books, had decided to auction the collection. The auction was to be held on August 10, 1840.

On the appointed date, numerous collectors and intellectuals gathered in Binche, hoping to bid on the books. They learned, however, that the offices of the notary where the auction was to take place did not exist – nor did the street upon which the offices were supposedly located. Notices which had been posted around Binche claimed that there would be no auction after all, because the town's public library had acquired the books; however, those attempting to visit the library to view the collection discovered that Binche possessed no public library. Later it was discovered that there had never been a Comte de Fortsas.

It was eventually revealed that the hoax had been planned and carried out by antiquarian and retired military officer Renier Hubert Ghislain Chalon, who enjoyed playing elaborate pranks on intellectuals.

Ironically, the original catalogue of fictitious unique books Chalon had sent to his victims has itself become a sought-after collector's item. It has since been reprinted several times.
