= La Binchoise =

Brewery in Binche, Belgium

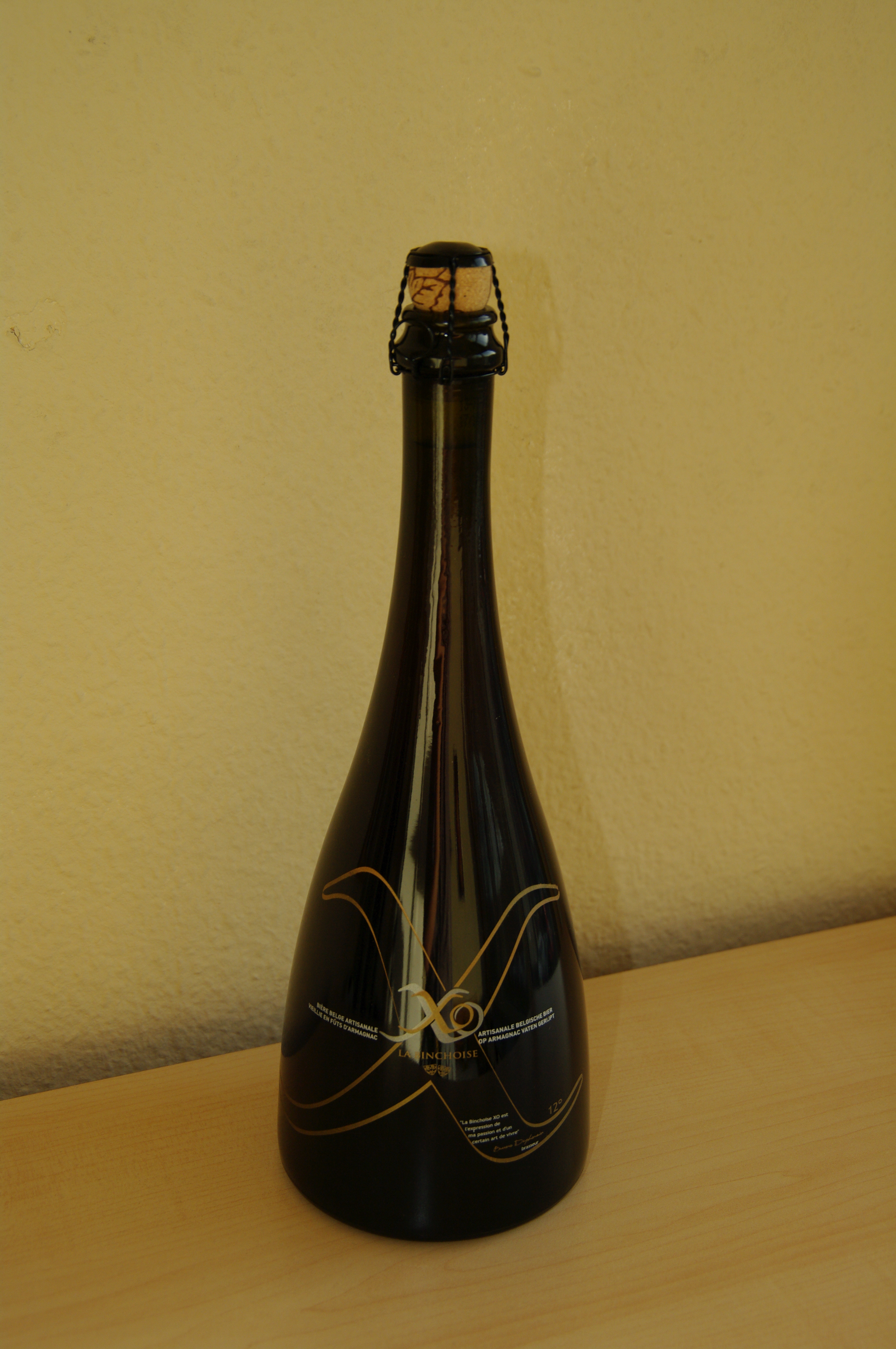
La Binchoise XO

La Binchoise is a beer brewery in Binche, Belgium. The brewery was founded in 1986 by husband and wife Graux-Jauson, unemployed at the time. They set up their business at home, but soon moved to the building of an old malthouse and quickly achieved commercial success, gaining a gold medal at the annual beer festival in Chicago. For a while their beer was made in a cauldron formerly owned by the Belgian National Guard. Their beers are refermented in the bottle.

== Types of beers ==
- Blonde tradition
- Brune tradition
- Reserve speciale
- Rose des Remparts
