= Thines =

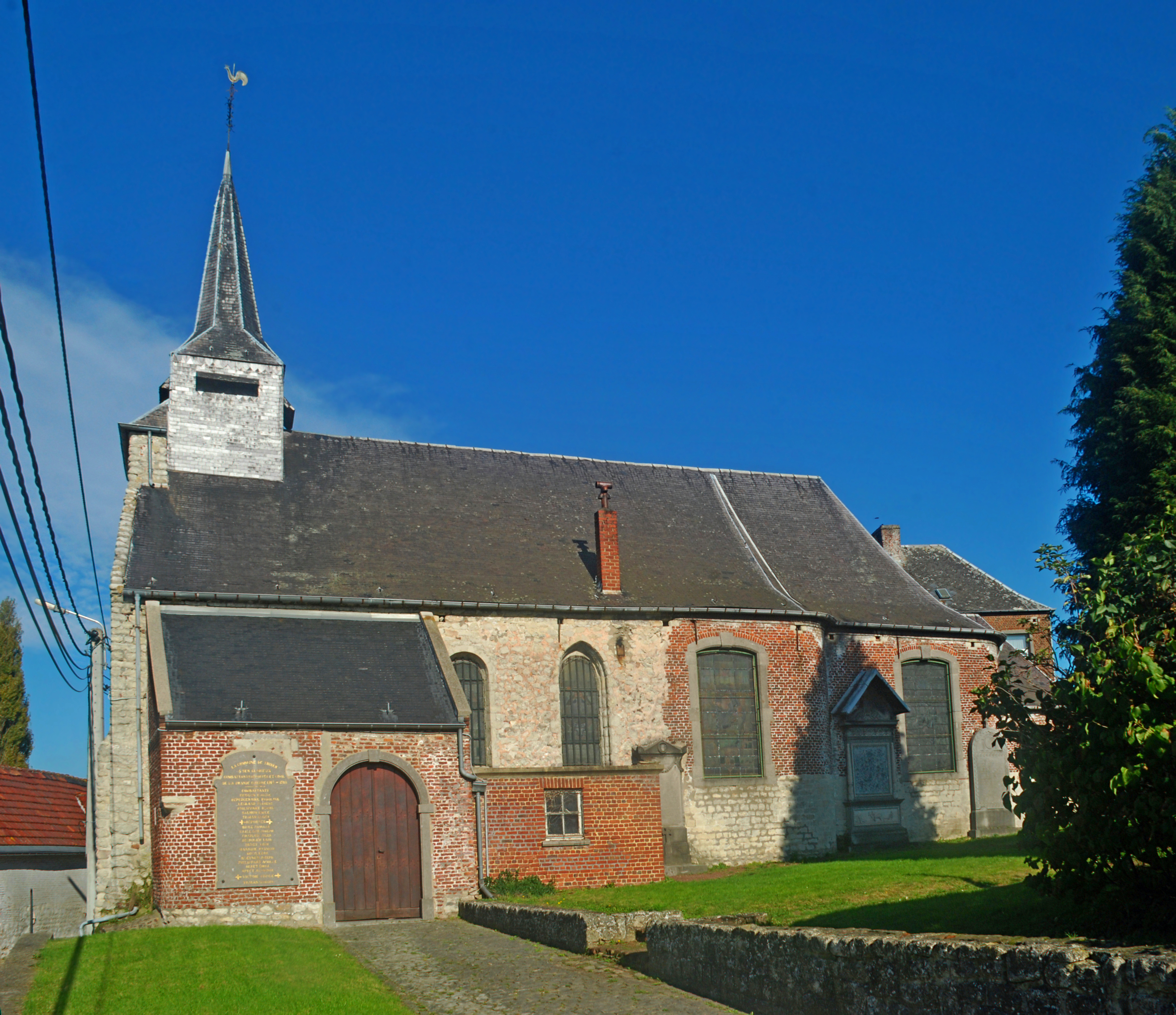
- Thines, the village church

- Location within Belgium Location within Europe
- Coordinates: 50°35′51″N 04°22′06″E
- Country: Belgium
- Region: Wallonia
- Province: Walloon Brabant
- Municipality: Nivelles

Thines (French pronunciation: [tin]) is a village of and a district of the municipality of Nivelles, located in the province of Walloon Brabant, Belgium.

The village is mentioned in written sources for the first time in 1181. From the middle of the 12th century until 1312, the village was a possession of the Knights Templar. During the wars of the 15th and 16th centuries, Thines suffered much devastation. The village church (Église Sainte-Marguerite de Thines) is a historical building, the oldest parts of which (facing west and the street) are from c. 1200.
