= Ange de Nivelles =

17th-century Bruxellois Capuchin author

Ange de Nivelles or François Saceius (active 1603–1632) was a Capuchin friar, religious leader, and spiritual author in the Habsburg Netherlands.

== Life ==
François Saceius was born in Nivelles around 1581, the son of Pierre Saceius and Jeanne Dufour. He was professed in the Capuchin Order in Brussels on 11 November 1603, taking the religious name Ange. He received minor orders in Brussels on 12 March 1604. In 1611 he was in Aire-sur-la-Lys and in 1632 was preacher in Huy. Ange organised a new congregation of the Third Order of Saint Francis in Armentières, the Bons-Fieux, whose rule was approved by Paul Boudot, Bishop of Arras, in 1627. This congregation later had communities in Arras, Lille, Ypres and a number of other towns.

== Writings ==
- Traicté spirituel de l'excellente dignité, valeur & bonheur de l'estat devot des filles et vefves spirituelles, dites filles de Sion (1625); the first book known to have been printed in Kortrijk.
