= Péronnes-lez-Binche =

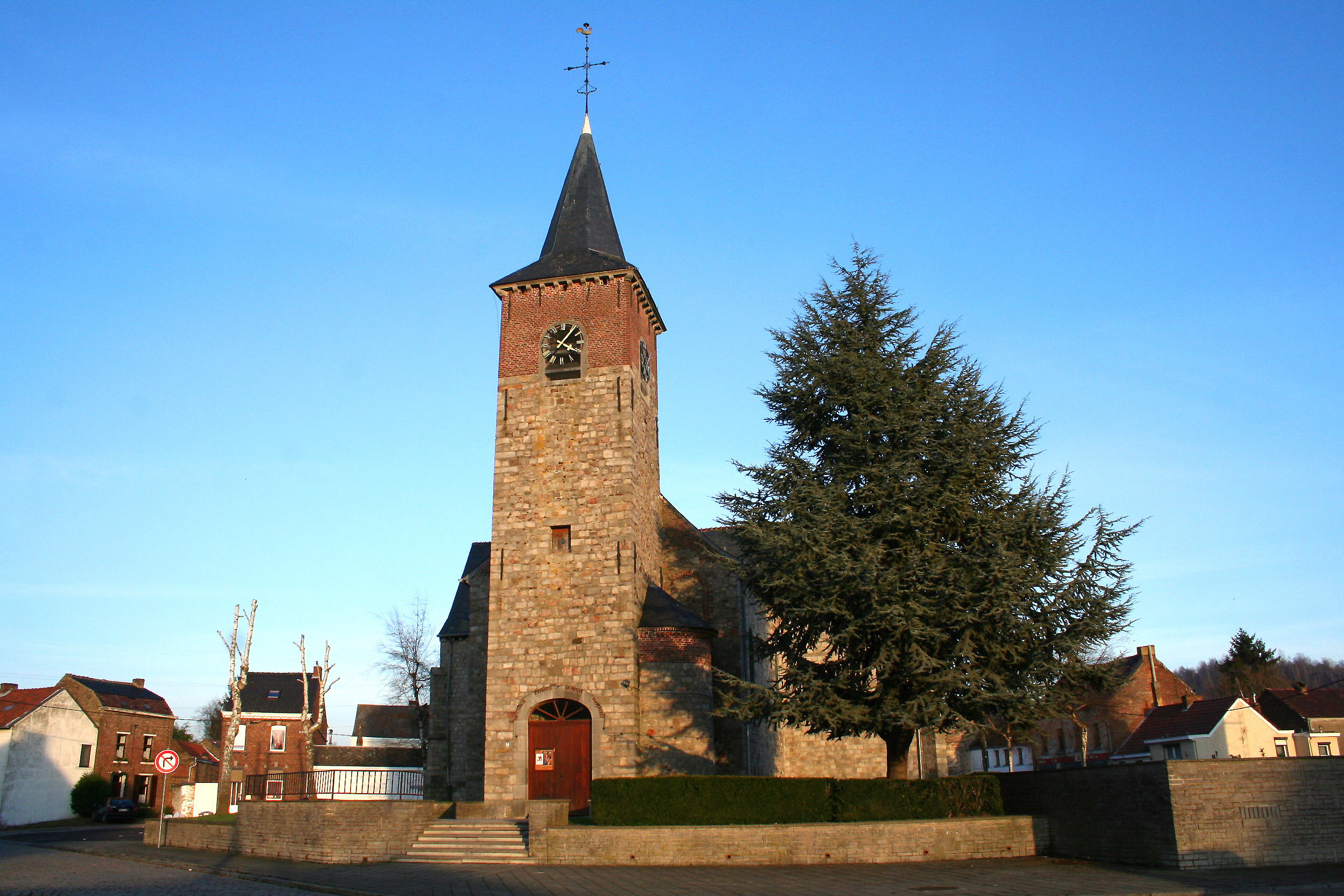
- The church Sainte-Marie in Péronnes-lez-Binche

- Location in Belgium
- Coordinates: 50°26′11″N 4°08′49″E
- Country: Belgium
- Region: Wallonia
- Province: Hainaut
- Municipality: Binche

Area
  - Total: 10.11 km^{2} (3.90 sq mi)

Population (2006)
  - Total: 4,417
  - Density: 436.9/km^{2} (1,132/sq mi)
- Area codes: 064

Péronnes-lez-Binche (French pronunciation: [peʁɔn le bɛ̃ʃ], lit. 'Péronnes near Binche'; Walloon: Perone) is a town in Wallonia and a district of the municipality of Binche located in the province of Hainaut, Belgium. It was a municipality before the 1977 fusion of the Belgian municipalities.

Péronnes became known for its coal rich ground which allowed the mining industry to grow. The mining industry has now been dead for decades but ancient coal hills and few infrastructure stays to remind of the golden age. The most well known building is Triage-Lavoir, coal washing plant, which was built in 1954 with the help of Marshall Plan.
