= Bornival =

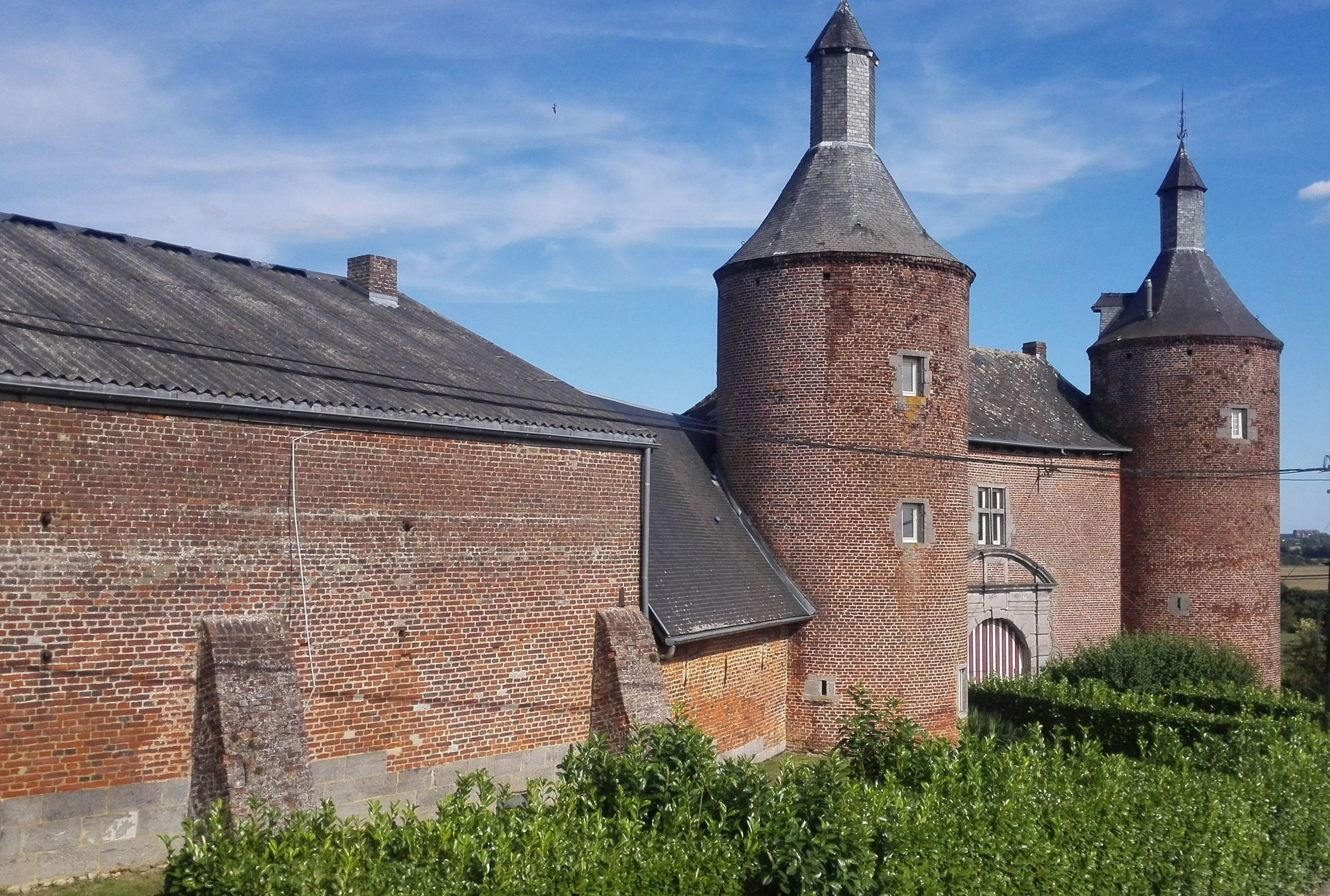
- Bornival, gatehouse (17th century) of the now vanished castle

- Location within Belgium Location within Europe
- Coordinates: 50°36′09″N 04°16′32″E
- Country: Belgium
- Region: Wallonia
- Province: Walloon Brabant
- Municipality: Nivelles

Bornival (French pronunciation: [bɔʁnival]) is a village of Wallonia and a district of the municipality of Nivelles, located in the province of Walloon Brabant, Belgium.

During the Middle Ages, the village was a small independent fief, wedged between holdings belong to the Nivelles Abbey and the lord of Enghien. The medieval castle has disappeared, but the gatehouse (17th century) is still preserved. The village church dates from 1603 and was renovated in 2003.
