= Antoine Baudeau de Somaize =

Antoine Baudeau, sieur de Somaize (born c. 1630) was a secretary to Marie Mancini, niece of Cardinal Mazarin. He published a Grand Dictionnaire des Prétieuses, ou La Clef de la Langue des Ruelles in 1660; a much enlarged edition was published in 1661. The same year he published a comedy, Le Procez des prétieuses, en vers burlesques.

== See also ==
- Hôtel de Rambouillet
