= Carnival of Binche =

Annual event preceding Ash Wednesday in Binche, Belgium

Carnival of Binche Carnaval de Binche
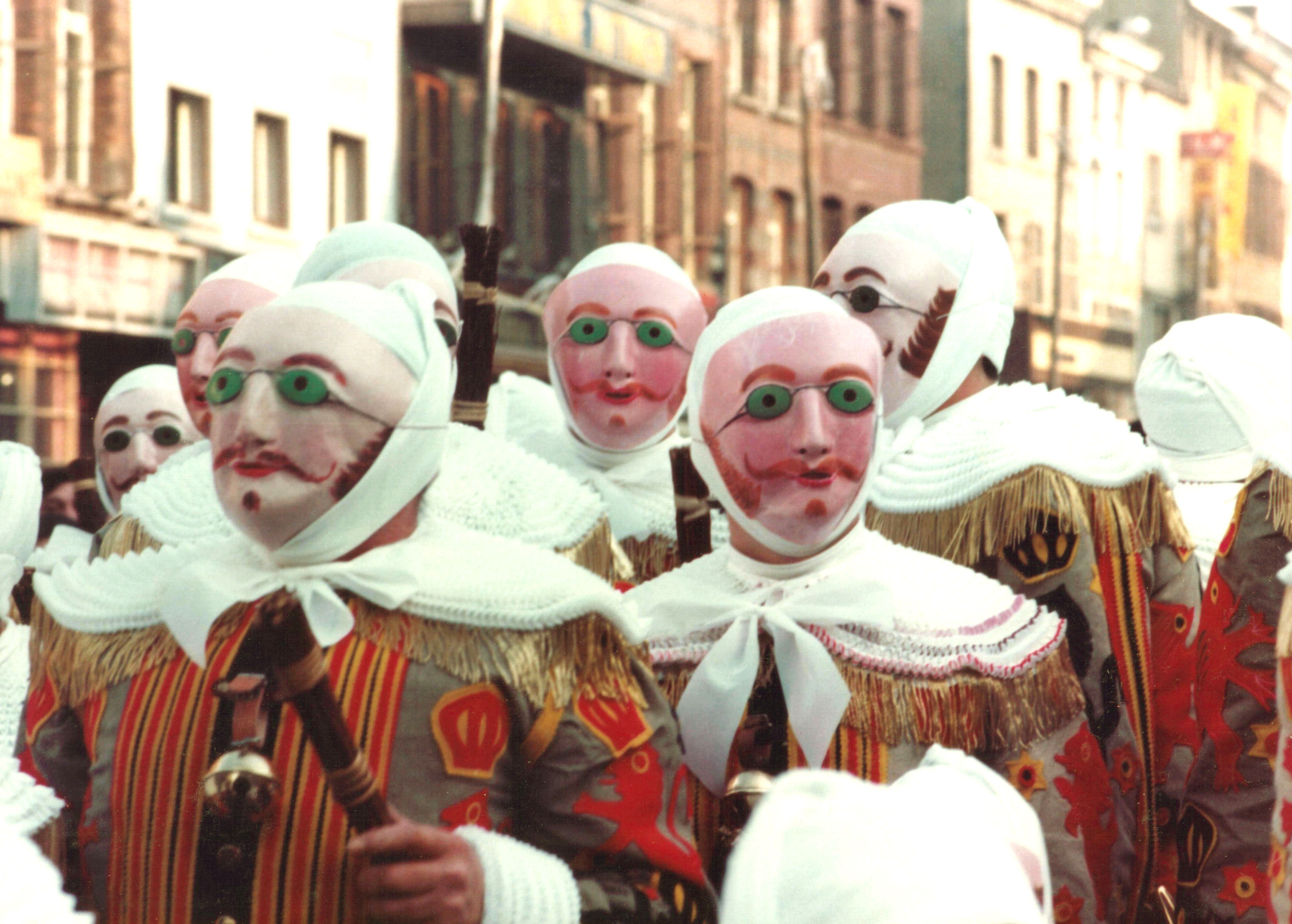
- The Gilles, clad in their costumes and wax masks, wielding sticks used to ward off spirits
- Status: Active
- Genre: Carnival
- Dates: Sunday, Monday, and Tuesday preceding Ash Wednesday
- Frequency: Annual
- Location: Binche
- Country: Belgium

Carnival of Binche
- UNESCO Intangible Cultural Heritage
- Country: Belgium
- Reference: 00033
- Region: Europe and North America

Inscription history
- Inscription: 2008 (3rd session)
- List: Representative

The Carnival of Binche (French: Carnaval de Binche) is an annual festival held in Binche, Hainaut, Belgium, during the Sunday, Monday, and Tuesday preceding Ash Wednesday.

The carnival's history dates back to approximately the 14th century, and it is today one of the best known of several that take place simultaneously in Wallonia, Belgium. Performers known as Gilles wear elaborate costumes in the national colours of red, black and yellow. During the parade, they throw oranges at the crowd.

Since 2003, the event has been recognised as a Masterpiece of the Oral and Intangible Heritage of Humanity by UNESCO, and it is also listed as intangible heritage of the French Community of Belgium.

== History ==
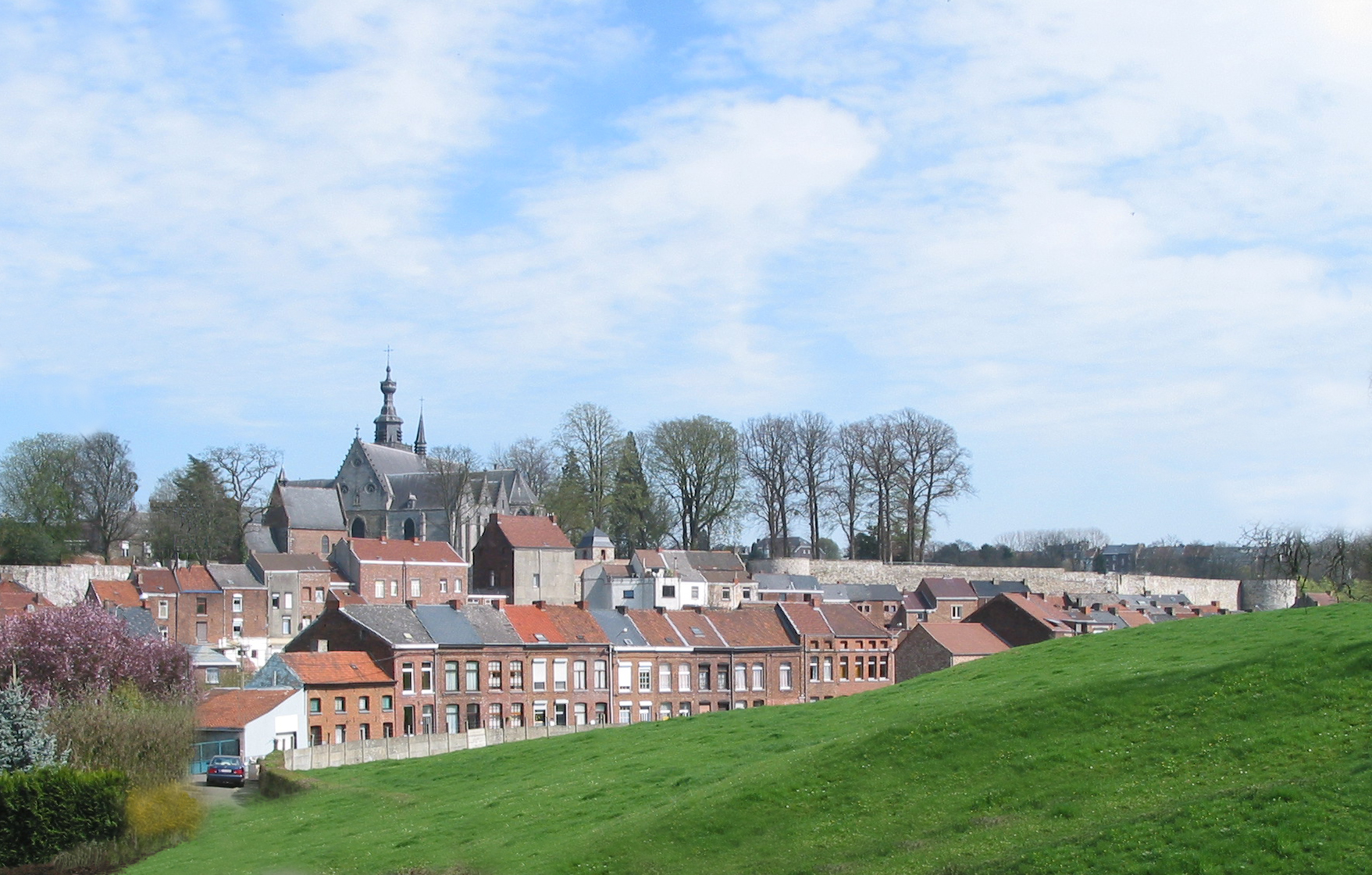
The town of Binche

The first written records of the Carnival of Binche date back to 1394, the festivities then corresponding to the beginning of Lent (the 40 days between Ash Wednesday and Easter).

Wearing a mask was forbidden under the Napoleonic regime, so the Gilles, some of the carnival's most important participants today, appeared for the first time in texts in 1795 as masked characters revolting.

In 2003, the Carnival of Binche was recognised as one of the Masterpieces of the Oral and Intangible Heritage of Humanity by UNESCO, and in 2004, as intangible heritage of the French Community of Belgium.

== Celebrations ==
Events related to the carnival begin up to seven weeks prior to the primary celebrations. Street performances and public displays traditionally occur on the Sundays approaching Ash Wednesday, consisting of prescribed musical acts, dancing, and marching. Large numbers of Binche's inhabitants spend the Sunday directly prior to Ash Wednesday in costume.

=== Gilles ===
The centrepiece of the carnival's proceedings are clown-like performers known as Gilles. Appearing, for the most part, on Shrove Tuesday (or Mardi Gras), the Gilles are characterised by their vibrant dress, wax masks and wooden footwear. They number up to 1,000 at any given time, range in age from 3 to 60 years old, and are customarily male. The honour of being a Gille at the carnival is something that is aspired to by local men.

From dawn on the morning of the carnival's final day, Gilles appear in the centre of Binche, to dance to the sound of drums and ward off evil spirits with sticks. Later during the day, they don large hats adorned with ostrich feathers, which can cost more than $300 US dollars to rent, and march through the town with baskets of oranges. These oranges are thrown to, and sometimes at, members of the crowd gathered to view the procession. (Note: The tradition of throwing oranges at members of the crowd is done in good spirit and not out of aggression, and to be hit was traditionally considered something to be proud of.) The vigour and longevity of the orange-throwing event has in the past caused damage to property – some residents choose to seal windows to prevent this. The oranges are considered good luck because they are a gift from the Gilles and it is an insult to throw them back.

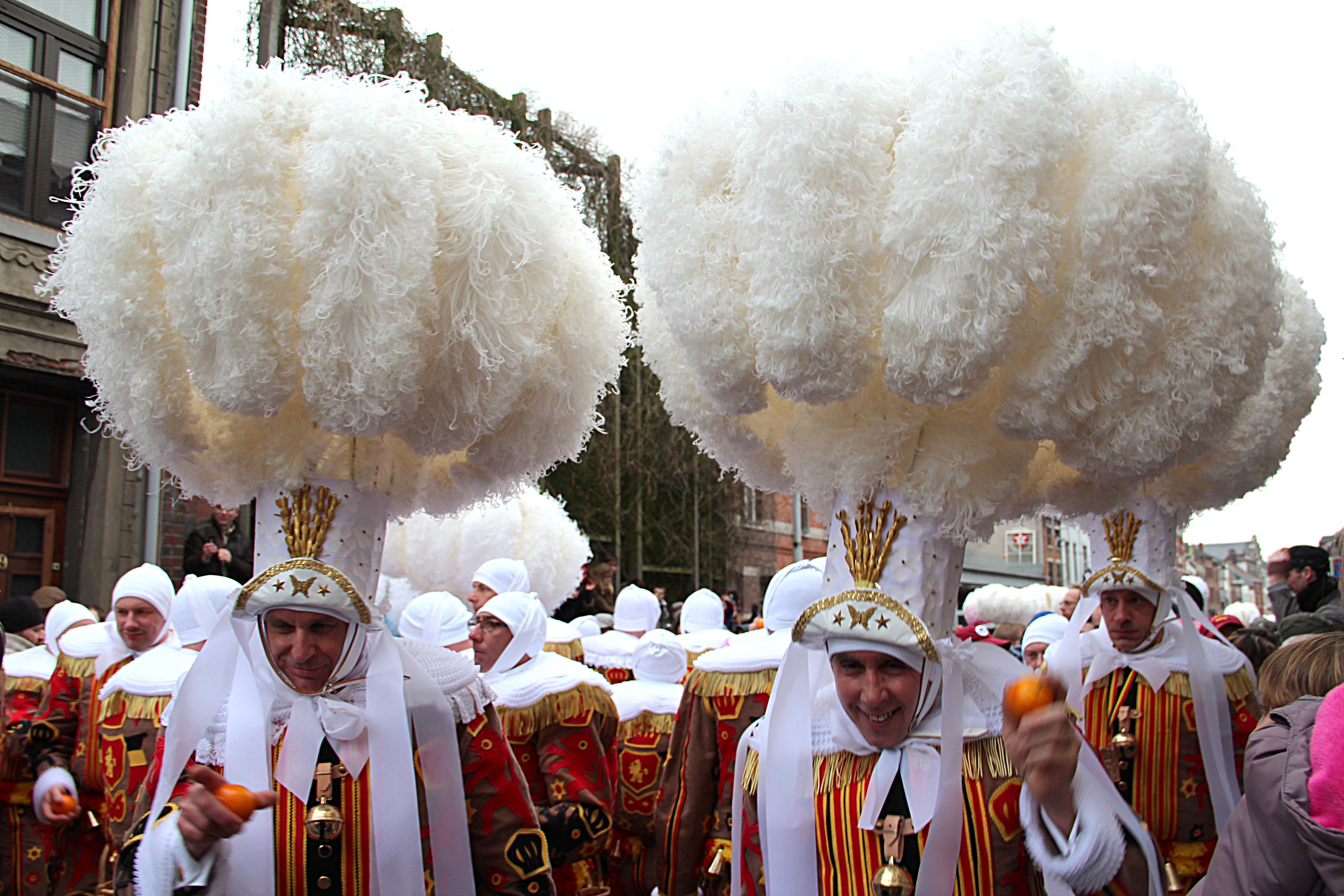
The Gilles wearing their hat with ostrich feathers on Shrove Tuesday

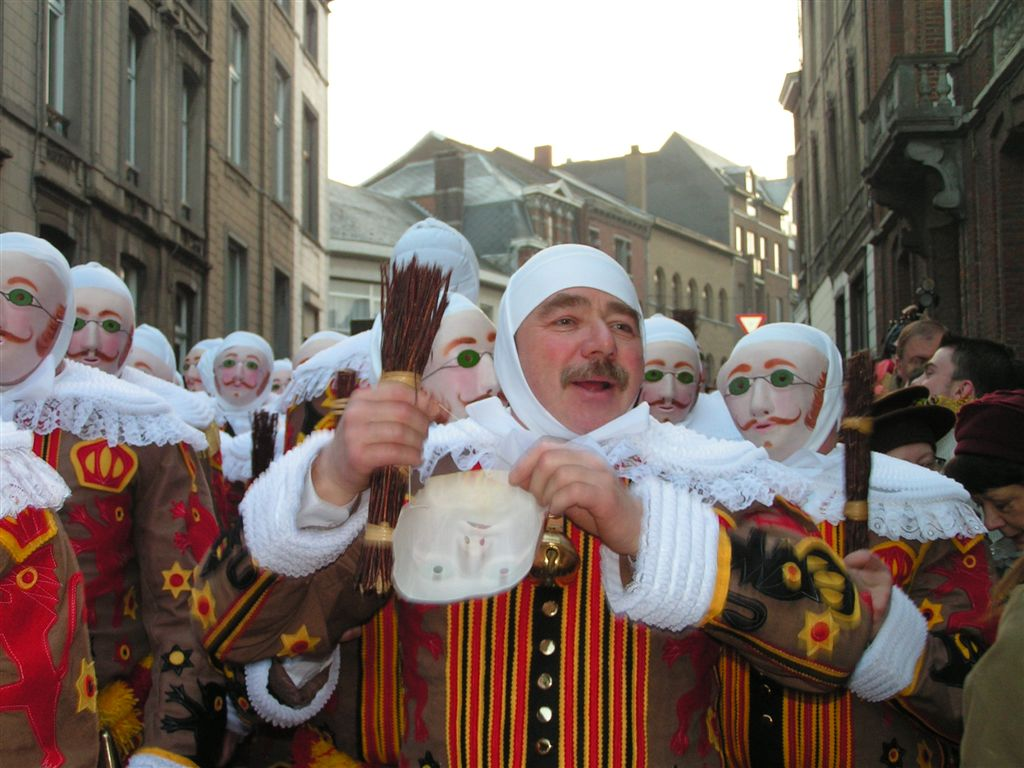
The Gilles putting on their masks to reach the main square

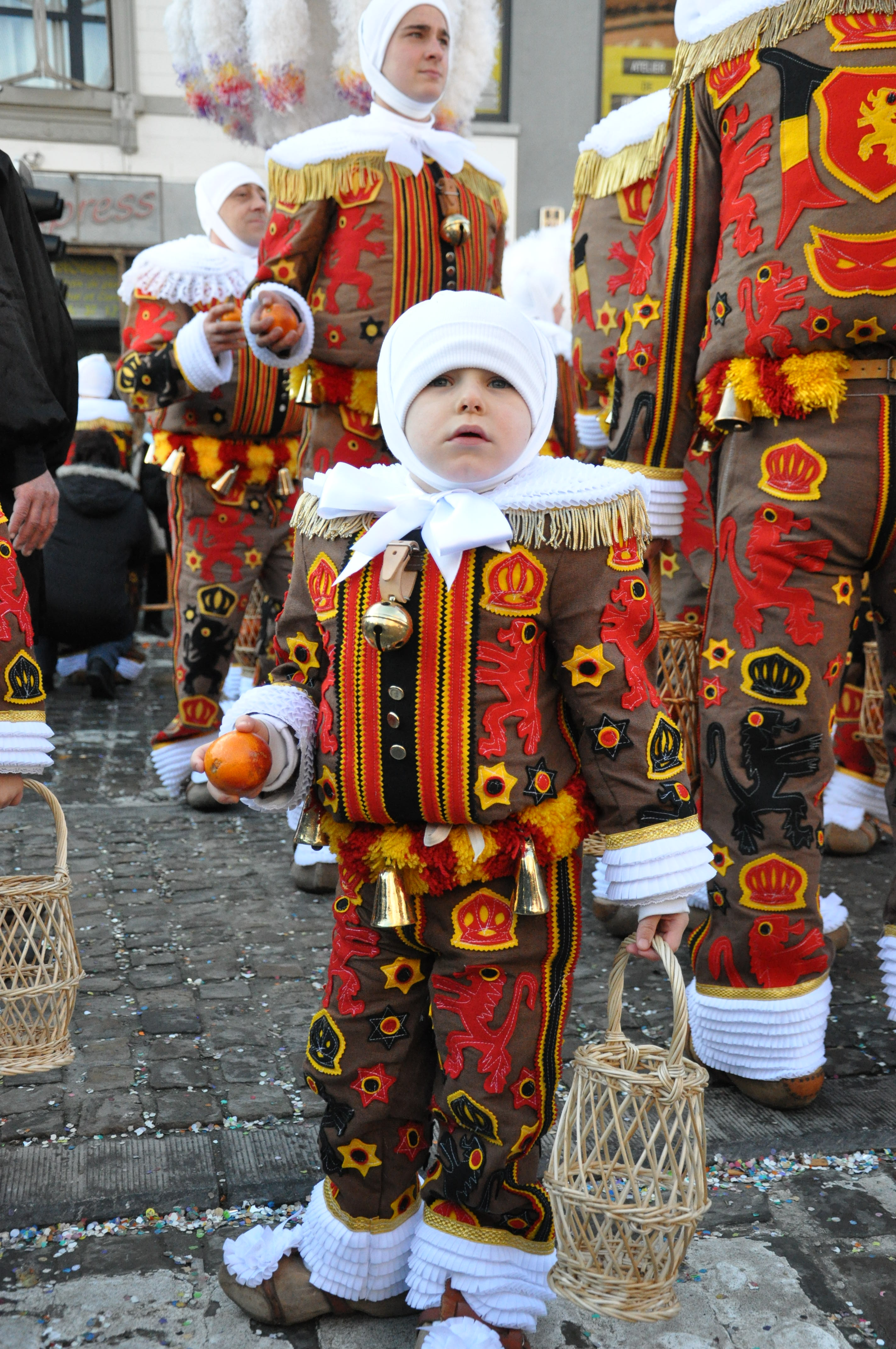
A young Gille carrying a basket and orange
