= Gilles =

Principal participants in the annual Carnival of Binche in Belgium

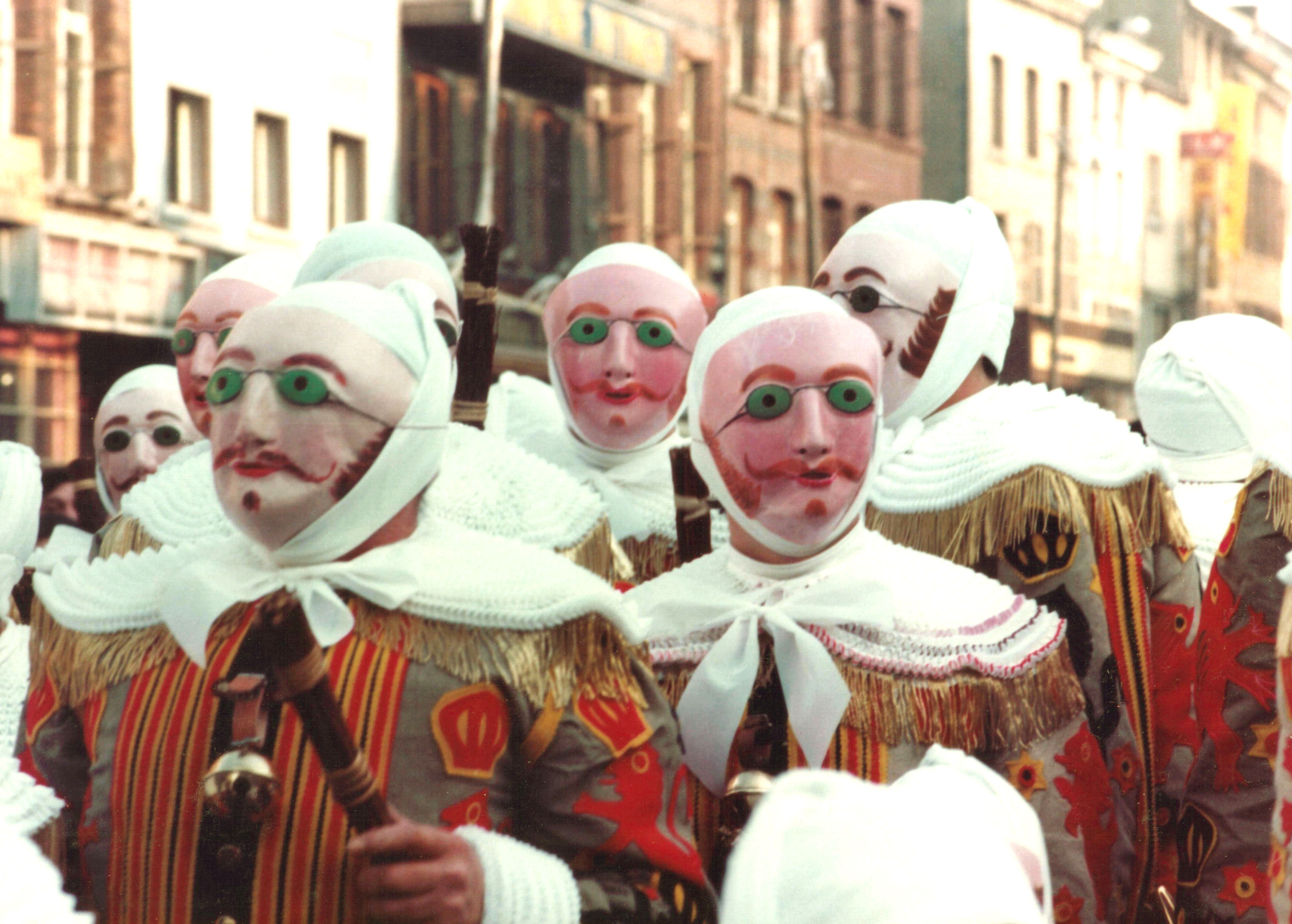
The Gilles, clad in their costumes and wax masks, wielding sticks used to ward off spirits

The Gilles are the oldest and principal participants in the Carnival of Binche in Belgium. They go out on Shrove Tuesday from 4 a.m. until late hours and dance to traditional songs. Other cities, such as Ressaix, Leval, Buvrinnes, Épinois, Waudrez, Anderlues, Chapelle-lez-Herlaimont, Estinnes, Le Roeulx, Manage, Morlanwelz, Seneffe, Nivelles, Charleroi and La Louvière have a tradition of Gilles at carnival, but the Carnival of Binche is by far the most famous. In 2003, the Carnival of Binche was proclaimed one of the Masterpieces of the Oral and Intangible Heritage of Humanity by UNESCO.

== History ==
The earliest documented reference to the Gilles is from 1795, when the revolutionary Directorate attempted to prohibit the wearing of masks. The traditional origins are a matter of speculation; one legend connects them to Mary of Hungary, who as governor of the Netherlands in 1549 organised a Joyous Entry into Brussels for the visit of her brother Charles V, Holy Roman Emperor and King of Spain. With the wealth then flowing to Spain from South America, elements of the Gille's costume, in particular the large plumed hat, might have come from attempts to represent an Inca costume. Another theory is that the masks, costume, and hunched back are derived from 17th-century commedia dell'arte, to which local colour has been added such as wearing clogs. The portrayal is suggestive of the character Pulcinella, which may have given rise to the name Gille, although confusingly within commedia dell'arte Gilles may also overlap with the character Pierrot.

== Costume ==
Around 1,000 Gilles, all male, some as young as three years old, wear the traditional costume of the Gille on Shrove Tuesday. The outfit features a linen suit with red, yellow, and black heraldic designs (the colours of the Belgian flag), trimmed with large white-lace cuffs and collars. The suit is stuffed with straw, giving the Gille a hunched back.

Gilles also wear wooden clogs and have bells attached to their belts. In the morning, they wear a wax mask of a particular design. After reaching the town hall, they remove these masks for the afternoon. During the afternoon parade, Gilles throw blood oranges to the crowd or at its members, and some wear large, white, feathered hats. Gilles carry ramons, tied bunches of twigs that are said to ward off evil spirits, and baskets in which to carry the oranges.

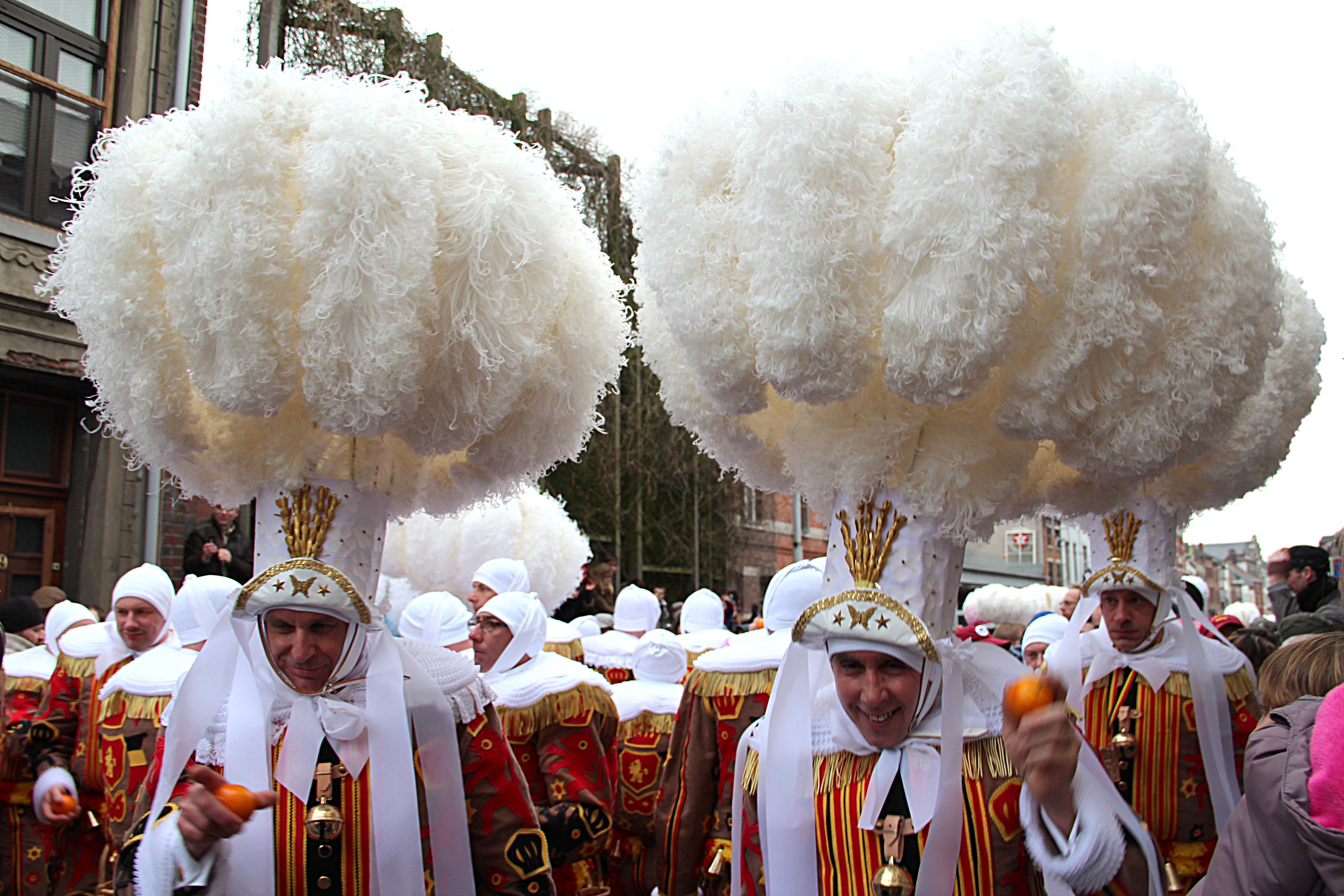
The Gilles wearing their hat with ostrich feathers on Shrove Tuesday

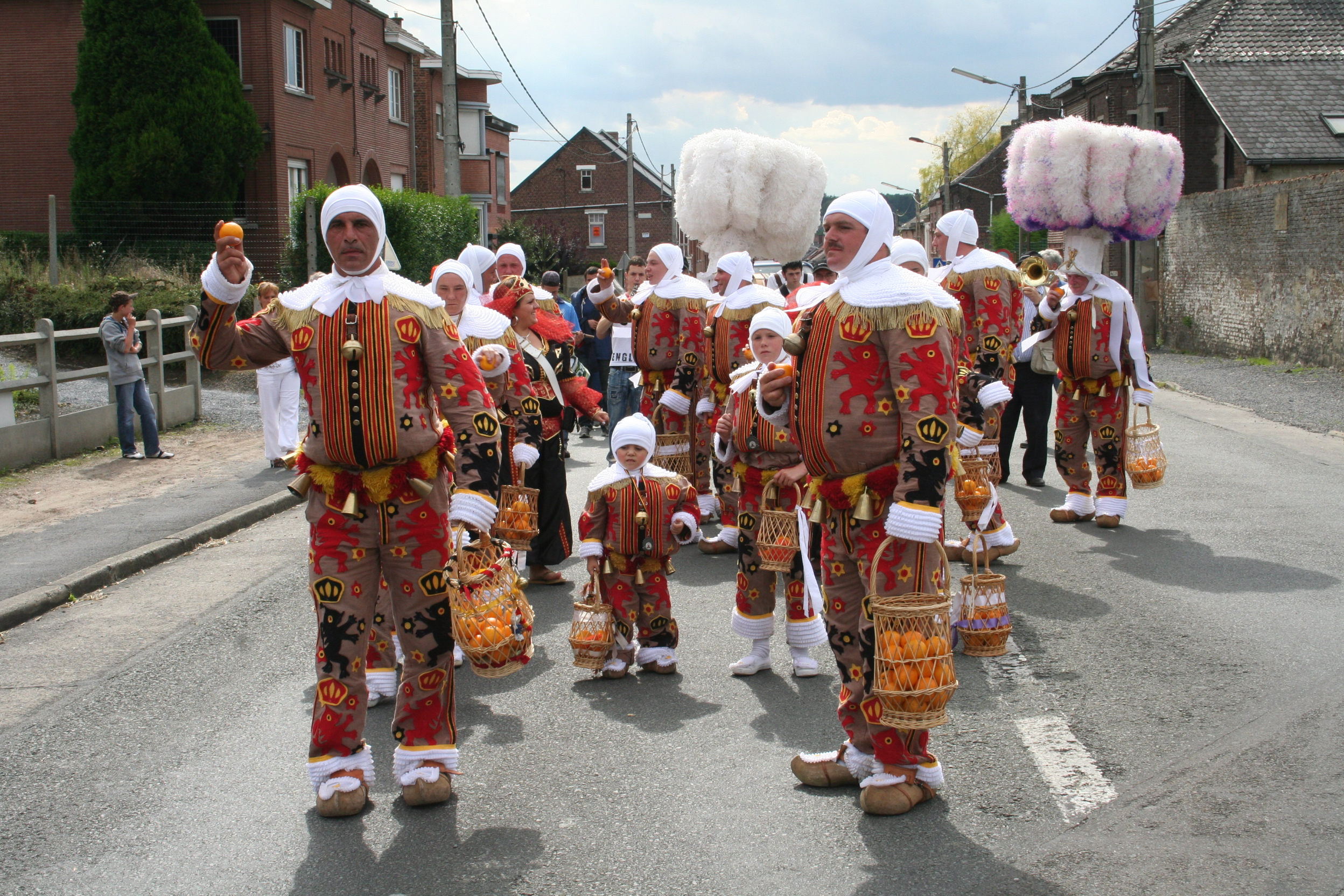
The Gilles, clad in their costumes and plumed hats

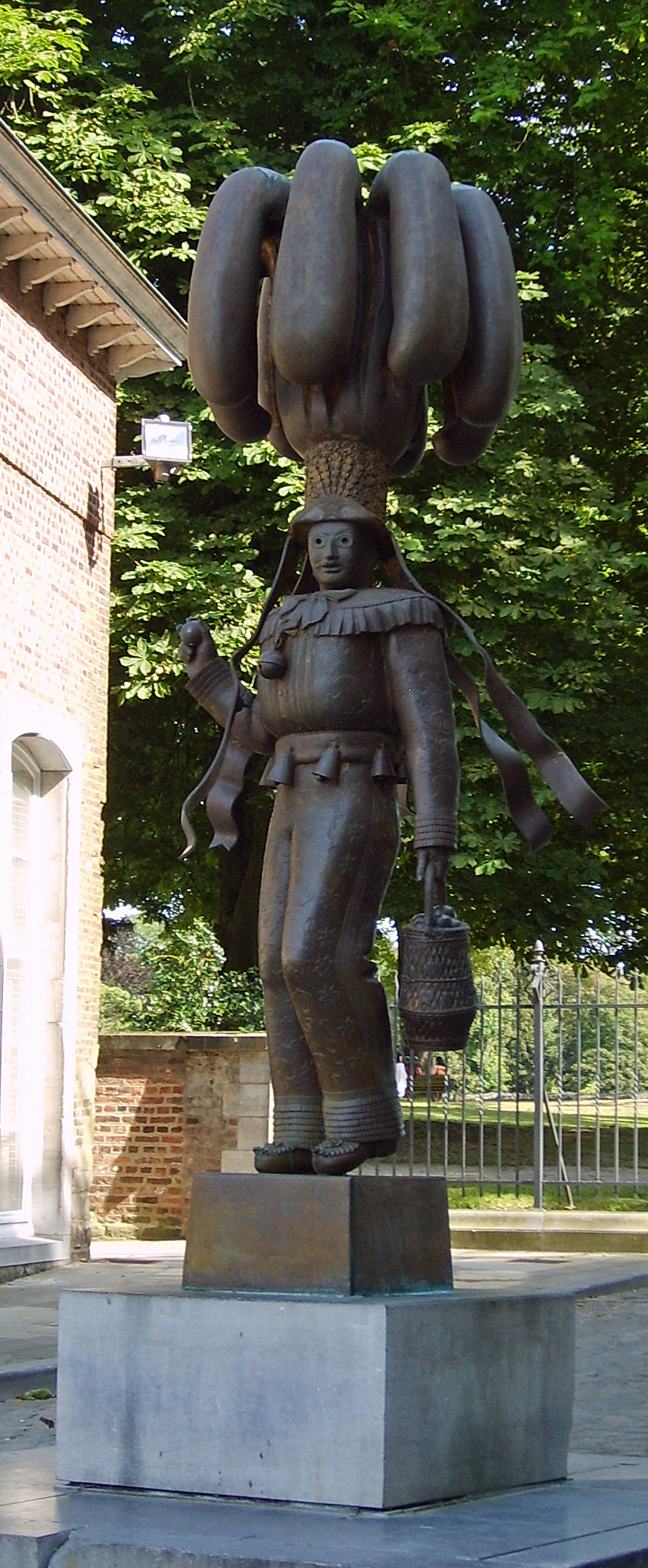
Gille de Binche (1952) by Robert Delnest
