= Binche =

City in Hainaut Province, Wallonia, Belgium

Binche Bince (Walloon)
- City and municipality
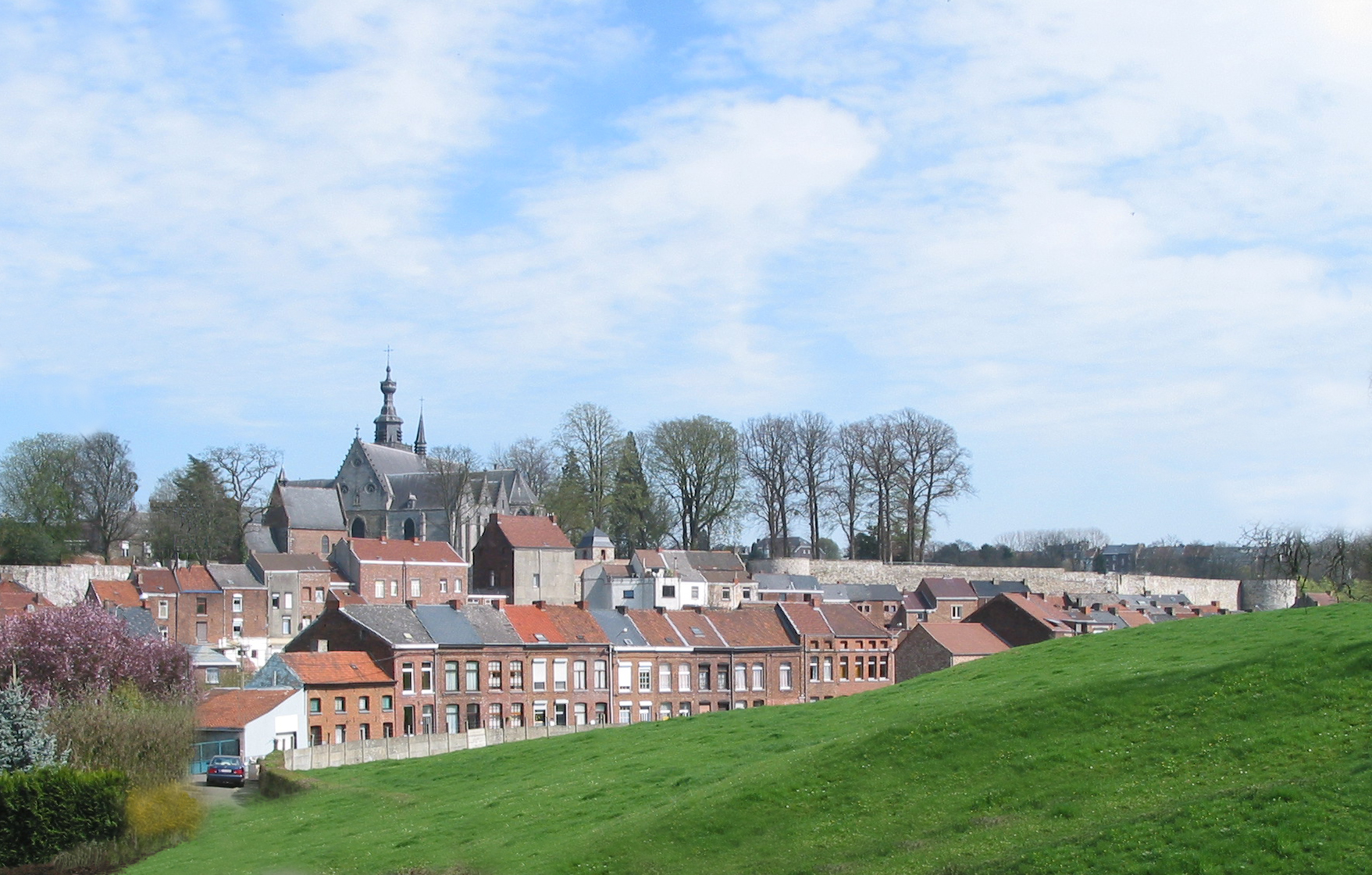
- Binche, the old city and its surrounding wall

- Flag Coat of arms

- Location of Binche in Hainaut
- Interactive map of Binche
- Location in Belgium
- Coordinates: 50°24′N 04°10′E
- Country: Belgium
- Community: French Community
- Region: Wallonia
- Province: Hainaut
- Arrondissement: La Louvière

Government
  - Mayor: Laurent Devin (PS)
  - Governing parties: PS, MR

Area
  - Total: 61.22 km^{2} (23.64 sq mi)

Population (2026-01-01)
  - Total: 33,841
  - Density: 552.8/km^{2} (1,432/sq mi)
- Postal codes: 7130, 7131, 7133, 7134
- NIS code: 58002
- Area codes: 064
- Website: www.binche.be

Binche (French pronunciation: [bɛ̃ʃ]; Walloon: Bince) is a city and municipality of Wallonia, in the province of Hainaut, Belgium. Since 1977, the municipality consists of Binche, Bray, Buvrinnes, Épinois, Leval-Trahegnies, Péronnes-lez-Binche, Ressaix, and Waudrez districts.

According to the surveys from 2021, Binche had a total population of 33,416, approximately 550 inhabitants per km^{2}.

The motto of the city is "Plus Oultre" (meaning "Further beyond" in Old French), which was the motto of Holy Roman Emperor Charles V, who in 1545 gave the medieval Castle of Binche to his sister, Queen Mary of Hungary. Her attention was spent on Binche, which she had rebuilt into Binche Palace under the direction of the architect-sculptor Jacques Du Brœucq, remembered today as the first master of Giambologna. This château, intended to rival Fontainebleau, was eventually destroyed by the soldiers of Henry II of France in 1554.

In 2003, the Carnival of Binche was proclaimed one of the Masterpieces of the Oral and Intangible Heritage of Humanity by UNESCO. In addition, the Belfry and City Hall were inscribed on the UNESCO World Heritage List as part of the Belfries of Belgium and France site, for its importance in civic functions, architecture, and its testimony to the power and influence of the town.

== History ==
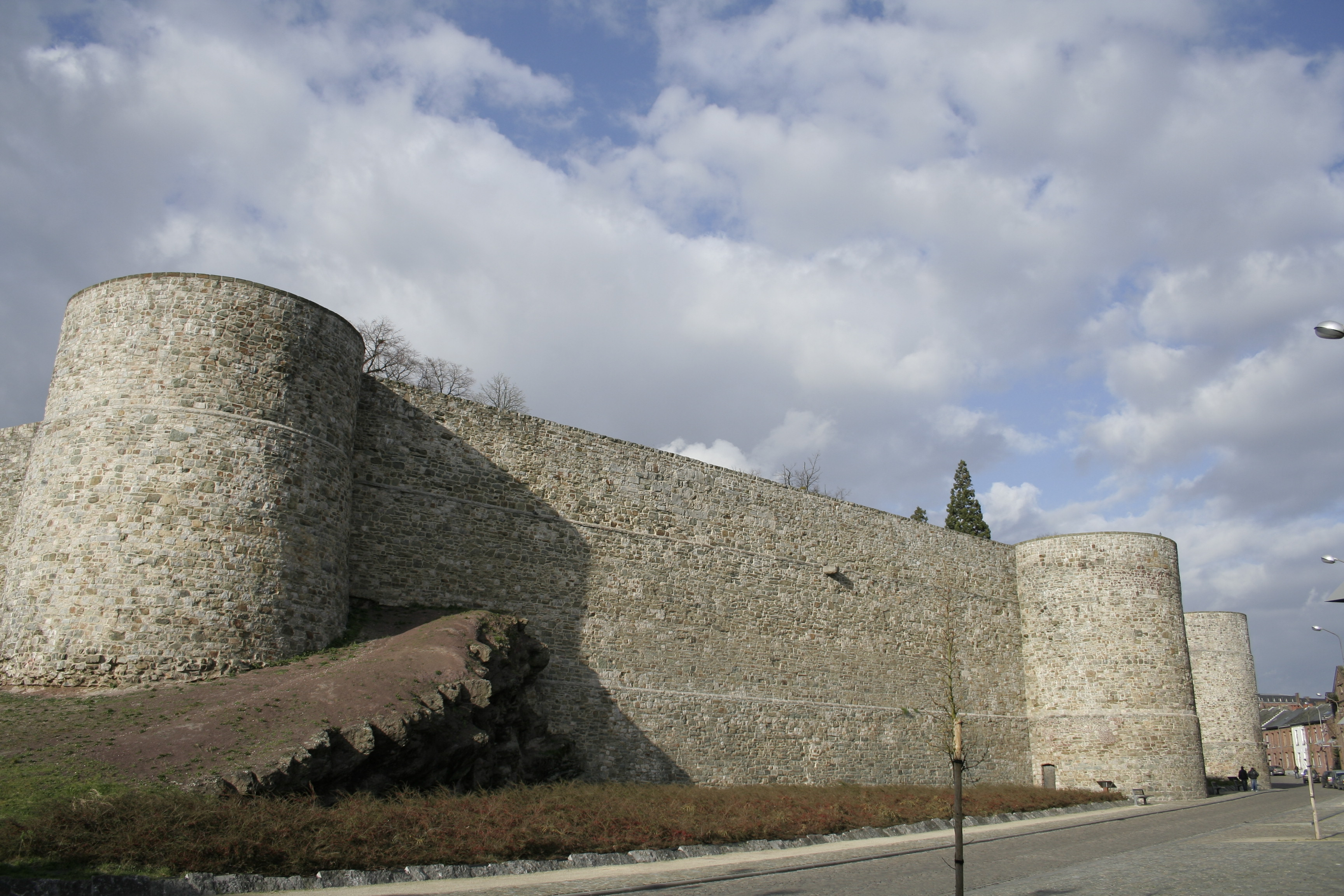
The remaining walls of the medieval castle of Binche

Binche came into being during the Middle Ages, near the Roman road that connected Bagacum, the capital of the Nervii, (now Bavay) to Colonia Claudia Ara Agrippinensium, (now Cologne). The road influenced trade and communication throughout Binche.

The city was officially founded in the 12th century by Yolande of Gelders, widow of Duke Baldwin III from Hainaut. Their son Baldwin IV fortified the city, which served as a frontier fortress against France. In the 14th century, the city wall was extended to its present size.

The city reached the peak of its economic power when Belgium was under Spanish rule. Binche was the residence of Mary of Hungary, governess of the Netherlands for her brother, Emperor Charles V. She had a magnificent palace built, designed by Jacques Du Brœucq, to compete with that of Fontainebleau. Charles V visited Binche in 1549 on invitation from his sister. For this occasion, she organized magnificent celebrations.

This period of prosperity came to an end in 1554 as the palace, the city, and the surrounding area were plundered by the troops of King Henry II of France. Until the beginning of the 18th century, Hainaut was the site of repeated military conflicts between the kingdoms of France and Spain.

The Industrial Revolution brought renewed prosperity. Coal mines' slag heaps still shape the landscape. Adding to this were the brickyards, tanneries, glaziers, breweries, lime kilns, and soap factories. Thousands of people worked at home as lace makers, cobblers, and tailors. Post offices and train stations were introduced in the city during this time.

== Carnival ==
The three-day Carnival of Binche is one of the best known in Belgium. It takes place around Shrove Tuesday (or Mardi Gras) just before Lent (the 40 days between Ash Wednesday and Easter). Performers known as Gilles wear elaborate costumes in the national colours of red, black and yellow. During the parade, they throw oranges at the crowd. In 2003, it was recognized by UNESCO as one of the Masterpieces of the Oral and Intangible Heritage of Humanity.

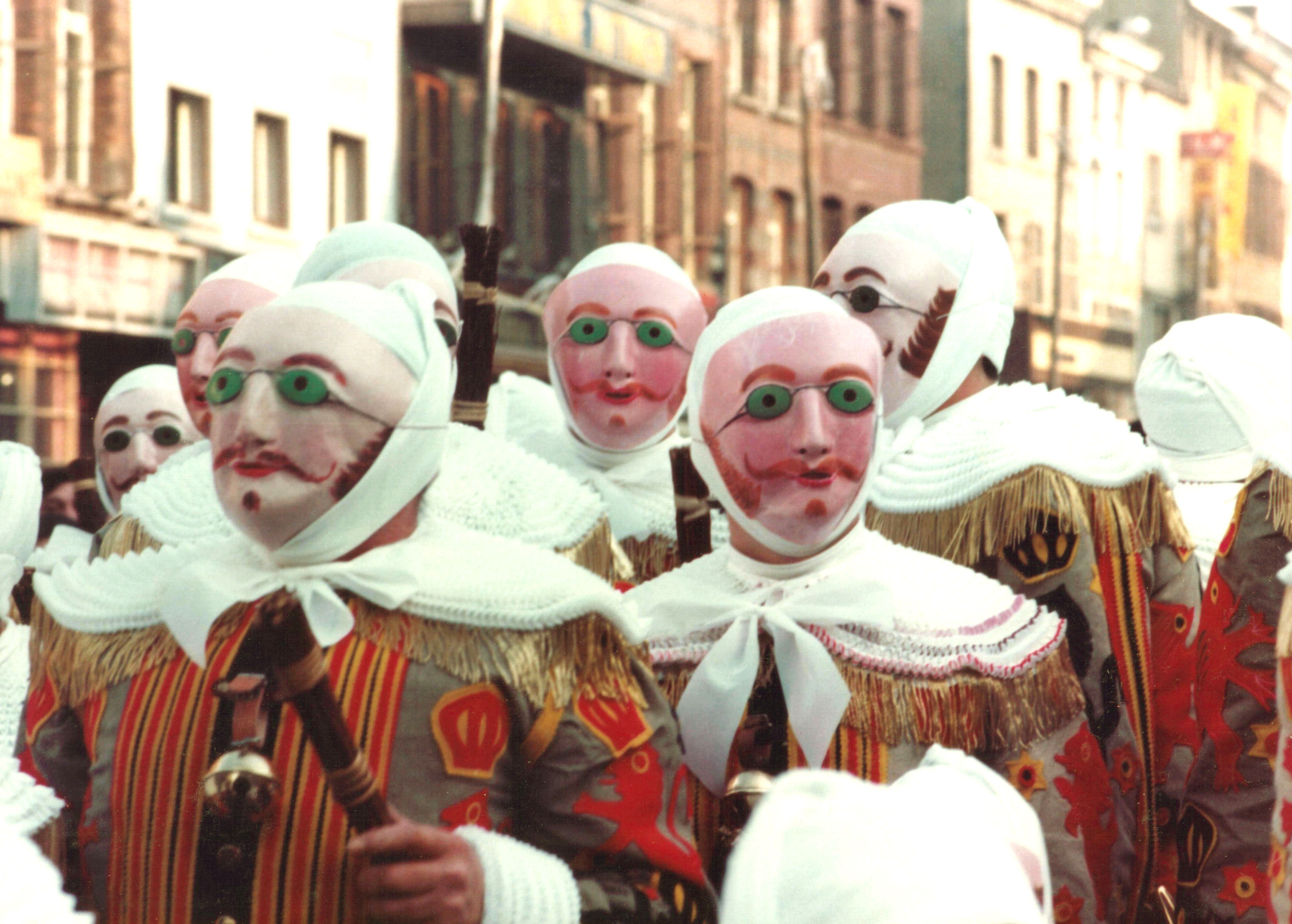
The Gilles, clad in their costumes and wax masks, wielding sticks used to ward off spirits

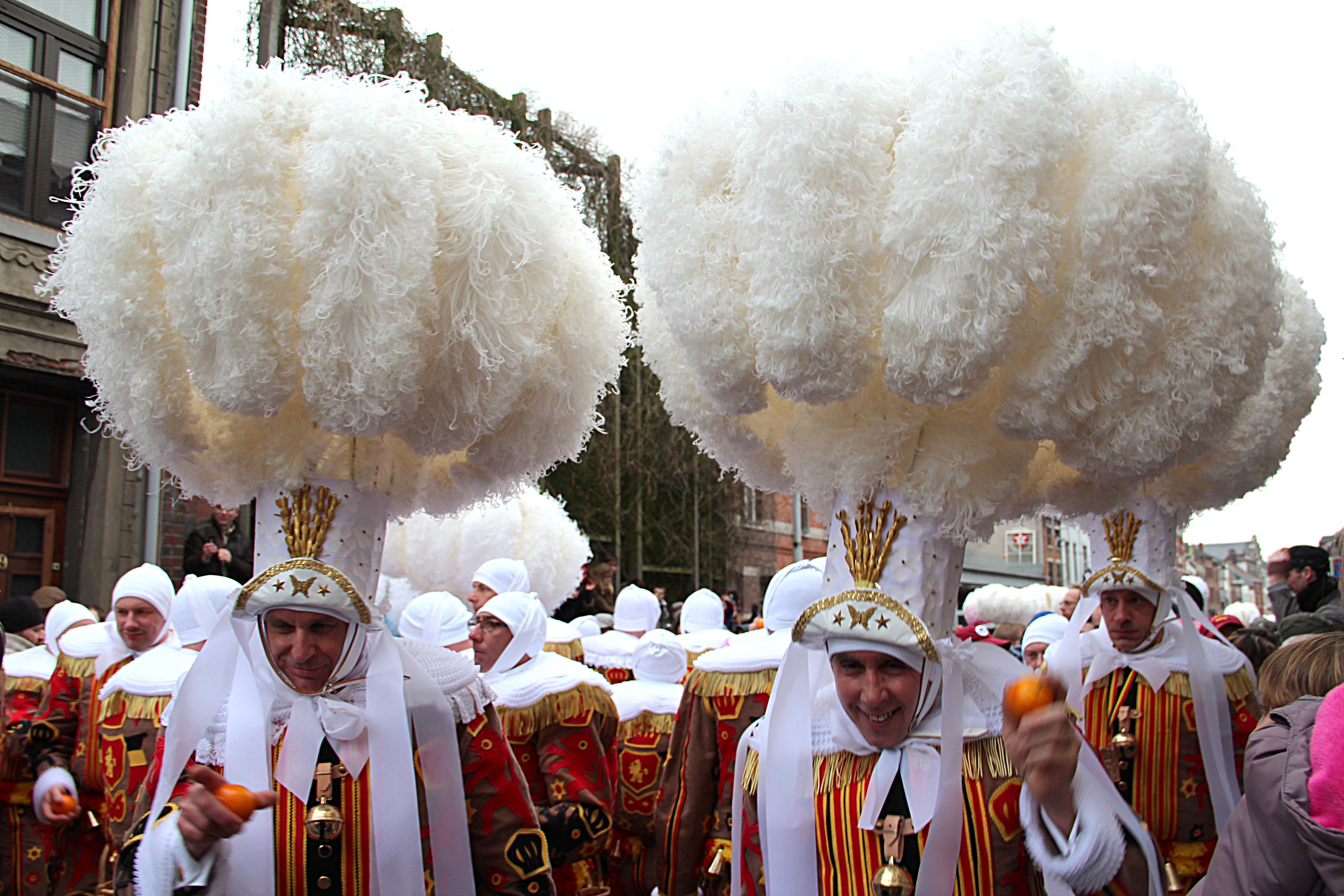
The Gilles wearing their hat with ostrich feathers on Shrove Tuesday

== Sport ==
Each year the town hosts the single day Binche-Chimay-Binche professional cycling race, which is rated as a 1.1 event on the UCI Europe Tour.

== Transportation ==
Binche railway station has been the terminus for passenger services on line 108 (Erquelinnes - Mariemont) since 1984. The island platform is out of use.

The large gothic style station building was designed by Leuven architect Pierre Langerock. It has coloured stained glass windows and is a protected monument. There are some inscriptions remaining from the Nazi German occupation.

To the front of the station is a square half-encircled by a balustrade. Sculpted in the Neo-classical style from blue stone, it incorporates statues commemorating illustrious figures from Binche’s past, including Charles V, Margaret of York and Mary of Hungary. A monument dedicated to independence was added in 1931. The area has been a heritage quarter since 1978.

== Notable people ==
- Gilles Binchois (c. 1400 – 1460), composer
- Berthe Dubail (1911–1984), painter.

== See also ==
- Binche lace
- Carnival of Binche, a yearly festival
- La Binchoise, a brewery in Binche
- Fortsas hoax, an incident in Binche in 1840
