= Belgian Railways Class 96 =

Electric multiple-unit train

SNCB AM96 / NMBS MS96
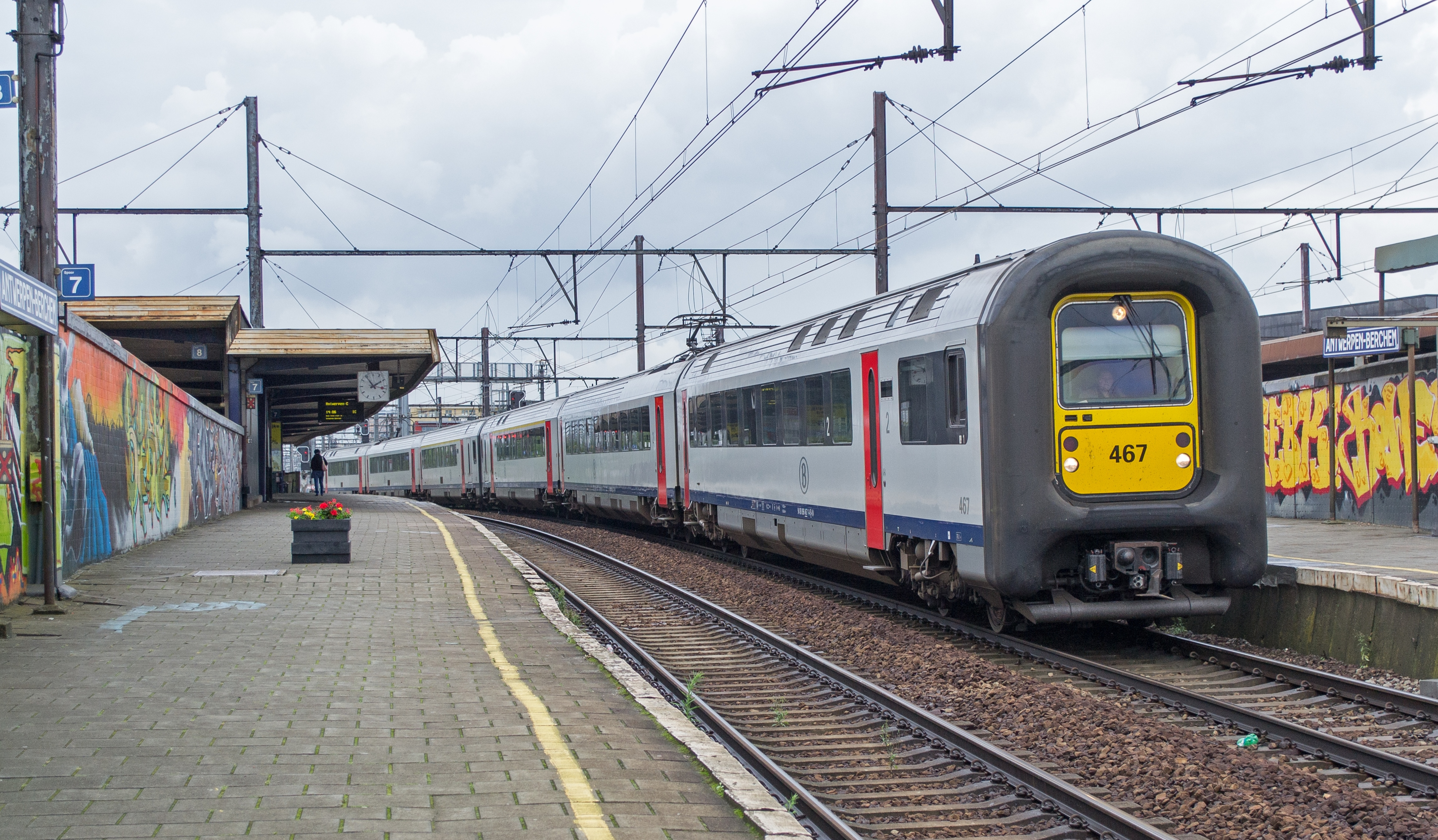
- Two Class 96 units at Antwerpen-Berchem

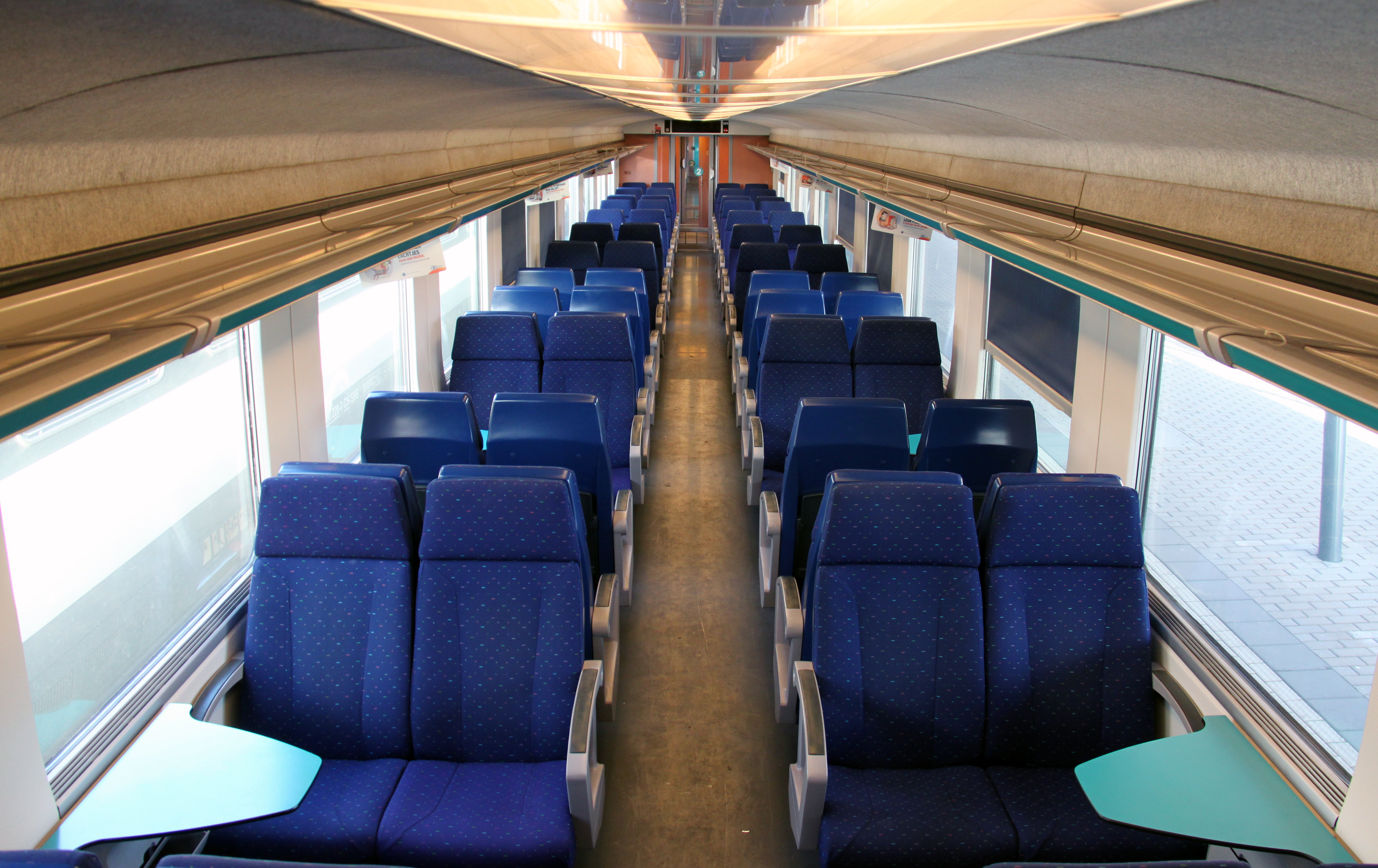
- Second class interior
- In service: 1996–present
- Manufacturer: Bombardier Transportation
- Built at: Bruges, Belgium
- Constructed: 1996
- Number built: 120
- Formation: Bx + B + ADx
- Fleet numbers: 441–490 (dual-voltage); 501–570 (DC-only)
- Capacity: 1st class: 45; 2nd class: 168; Total: 213
- Operator: NMBS/SNCB

Specifications
- Car length: 26,400 mm (86 ft 7 in)
- Width: 2,860 mm (9 ft 5 in)
- Maximum speed: 160 km/h (100 mph)
- Traction system: 441-547: GTO-VVVF; 548-570: IGBT-VVVF
- Traction motors: 4× ACEC 4EXA3046
- Power output: 1,400 hp (1,000 kW)
- Gear ratio: 105 : 23
- Electric systems: 441–490: 3 kV DC; 25 kV AC; 501–570: 3 kV DC
- UIC classification: Bo'Bo' + 2'2' + 2'2'
- Safety systems: Memor, TBL 1+, KVB, ETCS
- Coupling system: Scharfenberg
- Track gauge: 1,435 mm (4 ft 8 1/2 in)

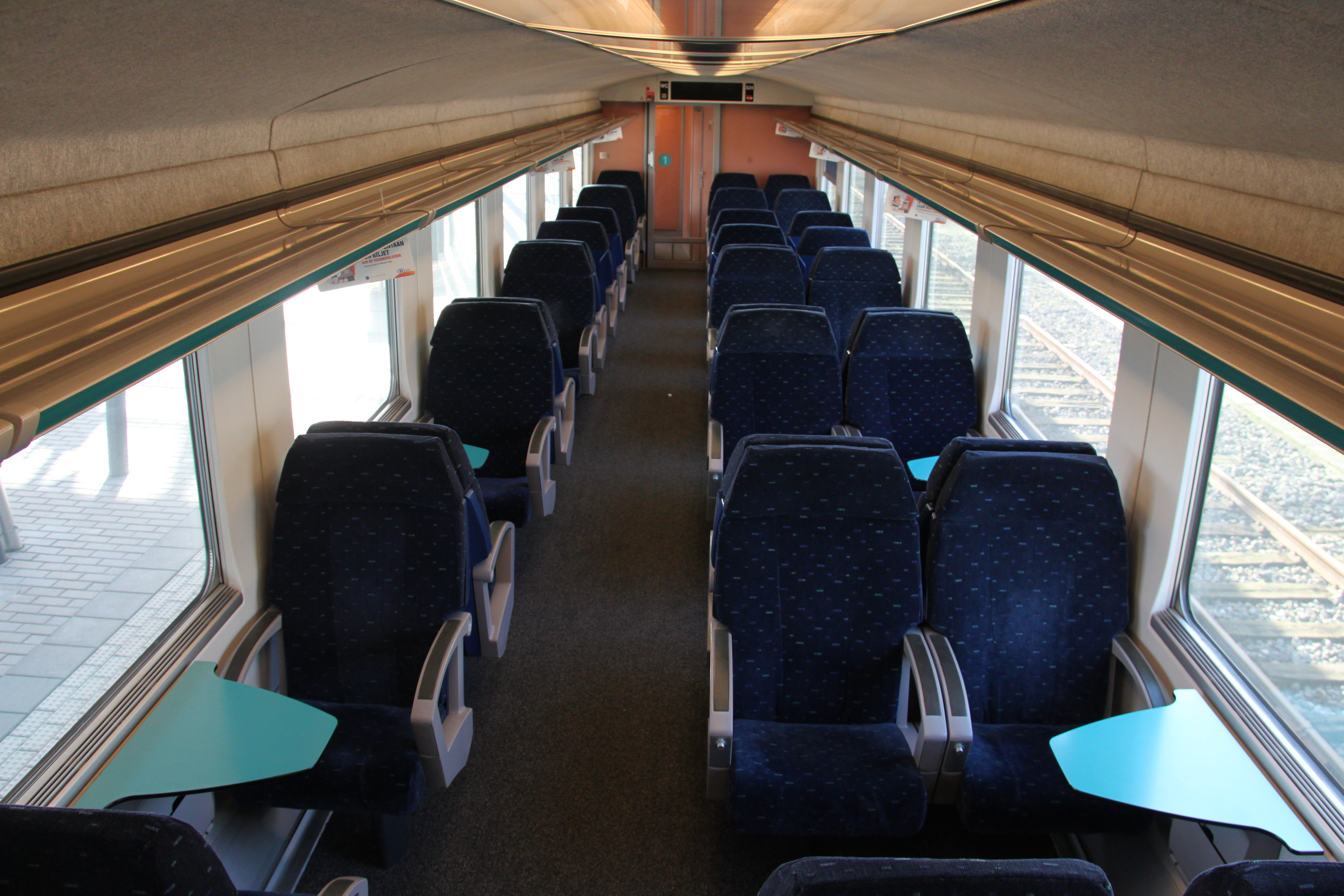
First class interior

The class 96 (MS96 in Dutch, AM96 in French) is an electric multiple unit constructed in 1996 for the National Railway Company of Belgium.

They incorporate features from the DSB IC3^{da} trainsets in order to enable passage from one set coach to another. When two or more units are coupled together in a single train, the entire front door folds away to give a wide passage, and the rubber diaphragms at the ends form a flush aerodynamic seal. The trainsets have air conditioning that can be controlled per coach, which makes them suitable for long distances.

As of summer 2022, these trainsets are used almost exclusively on IC connections:

- IC-03: Blankenberge - Brussels - Sint-Truiden - Genk
- IC-04: Antwerp Central - Kortrijk - Poperinge / Lille-Flandres (F)
- IC-06: Tournai - Brussels - Brussels Airport
- IC-06A: Mons - Brussels - Brussels Airport
- IC-13 Kortrijk - Zottegem - Denderleeuw - Brussels - Schaarbeek
- IC-18: Brussels - Namur - Liège-Saint-Lambert
- IC-19: Namur - Tournai - Lille-Flandres (F)
- IC-23: Ostend - Kortrijk - Zottegem - Brussels - Brussels Airport
- IC-23A: Knokke - Brussels - Brussels Airport
- IC-25: Mons - Namur - Liège-Saint-Lambert
- IC-26 Hasselt-Brussels airport- Antwerpen Central
- IC-29: Ghent - Aalst - Brussels - Brussels Airport - Landen
- IC-32: Kortrijk - Bruges (routes 805, 821, 841)
- IC-41: Namur - Charleroi - Maubeuge (F)
- IC-42: Mons - Aulnoye-Aymeries (F)

The MS96 also runs a limited number of P trains, L trains and S trains.

Versions:

There are three different variants of MS96, which can run together in train connection :

- 441-490: two-voltage motor trains; they can run on the classic Belgian railway network of 3 kV⎓ and on the network of 25 kV~, the border lines to France and Luxembourg and. Theoretically, they could also be operated on the high-speed line from Leuven to Liège, but they are not homologated for this. These units are equipped with GTO traction converters.
- 501-547: single-voltage motor sets; these can only run on the traditional Belgian rail network of 3 kV⎓ and until September 2018 also on the border section Arlon - Luxembourg (501–524), also 3 kV⎓. These units are equipped with GTO traction converters.
- 548-570: single-voltage motor sets; these can only run on the classic Belgian railway network of 3 kV⎓. These units are equipped with IGBT traction converters.

(The "classic" Belgian 3kV rail network includes all Belgian electric lines that do not cross a border with the exception of the high-speed lines and lines 42 Rivage – Gouvy, 165 Libramont – Bertrix – Athus, 166 Dinant – Bertrix and 167 Arlon – Athus – Rodange (L), equipped with 25 kV alternating current.)

The latter two types are adaptable to 25 kV~, but since this is not necessary for most railway lines in Belgium, this investment has not yet been made. In addition, all types can run on the border section of the Liège - Maastricht route, where the Dutch overhead line voltage of 1.5 kV = 1.5 kV is used for a few kilometers. Because these trains are designed for 3 kV=, they can only run at a quarter of the capacity under the Dutch overhead lines. But since the Belgian overhead line on this route reaches Eijsden station, and there are no slopes parallel to the Maas, that is not a problem.

- Motors: 4 asynchronous motors
- At the end of 2010, the NMBS started removing the TBL 2 equipment and installing a TBL 1+ equipment.
- 2020: installation of ETCS Level 1 (also 1 LS) and Level 2

== Gallery ==
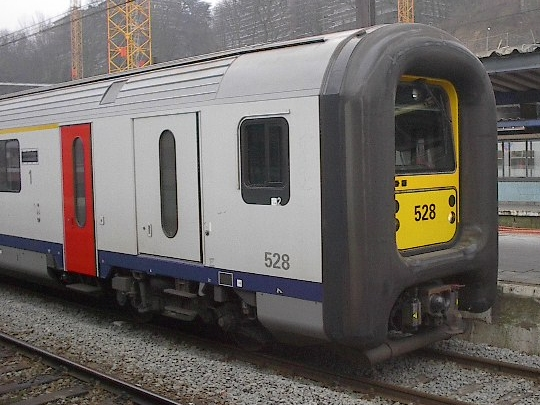
Cab end of a Class 96

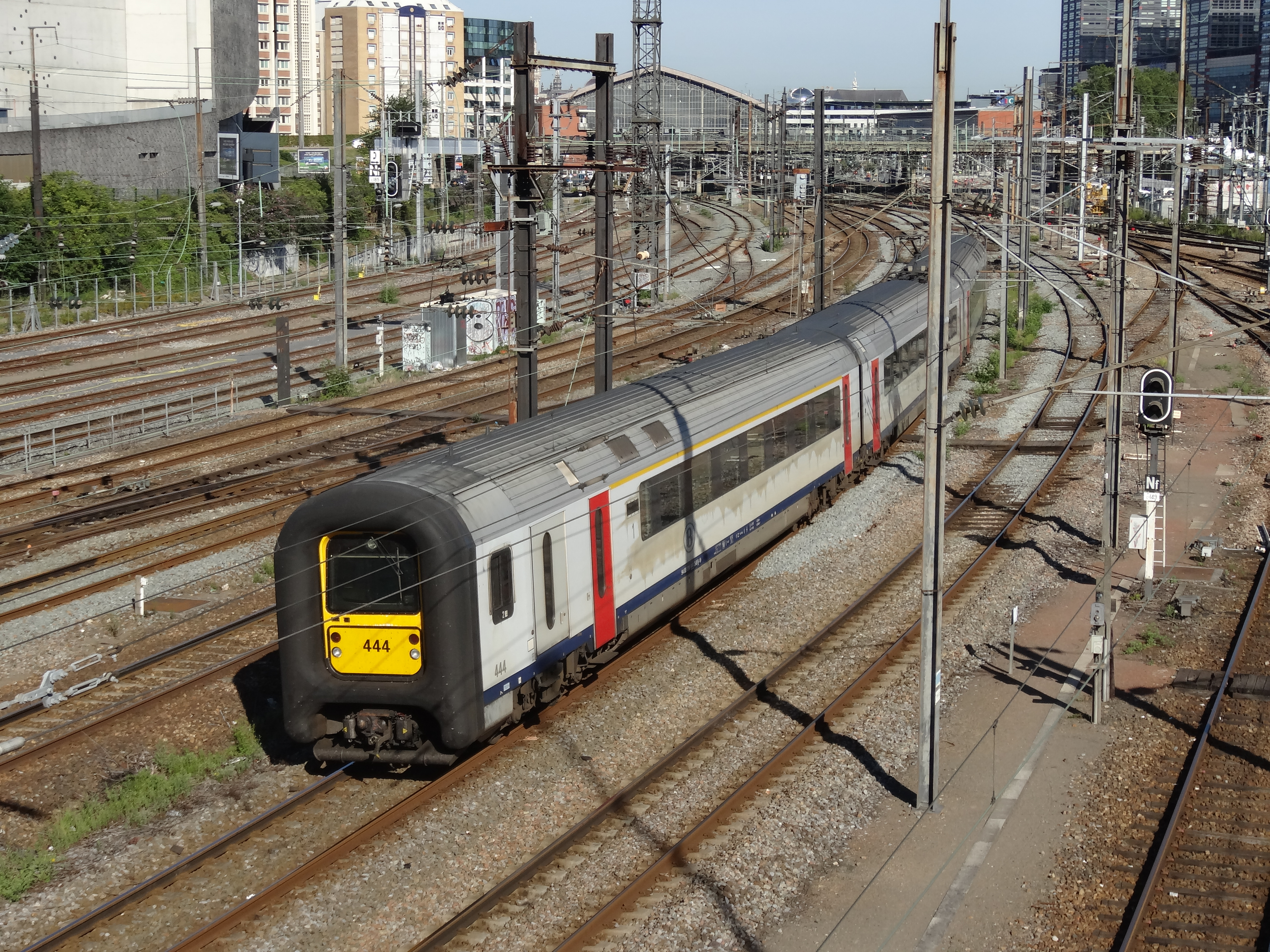
NMBS/SNCB train approaching Gare de Lille Flandres.

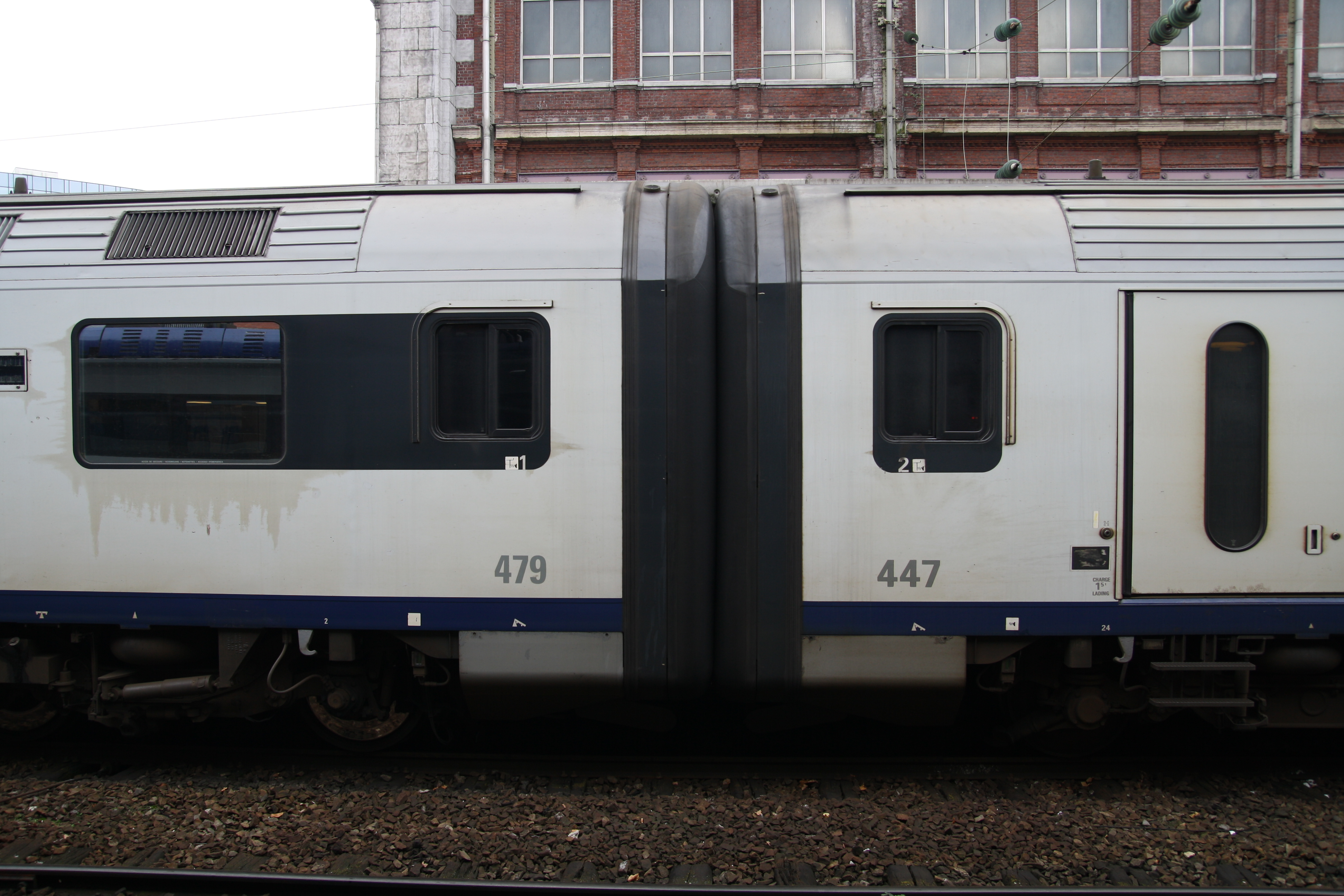
Two sets coupled in Gare de Lille Flandres.

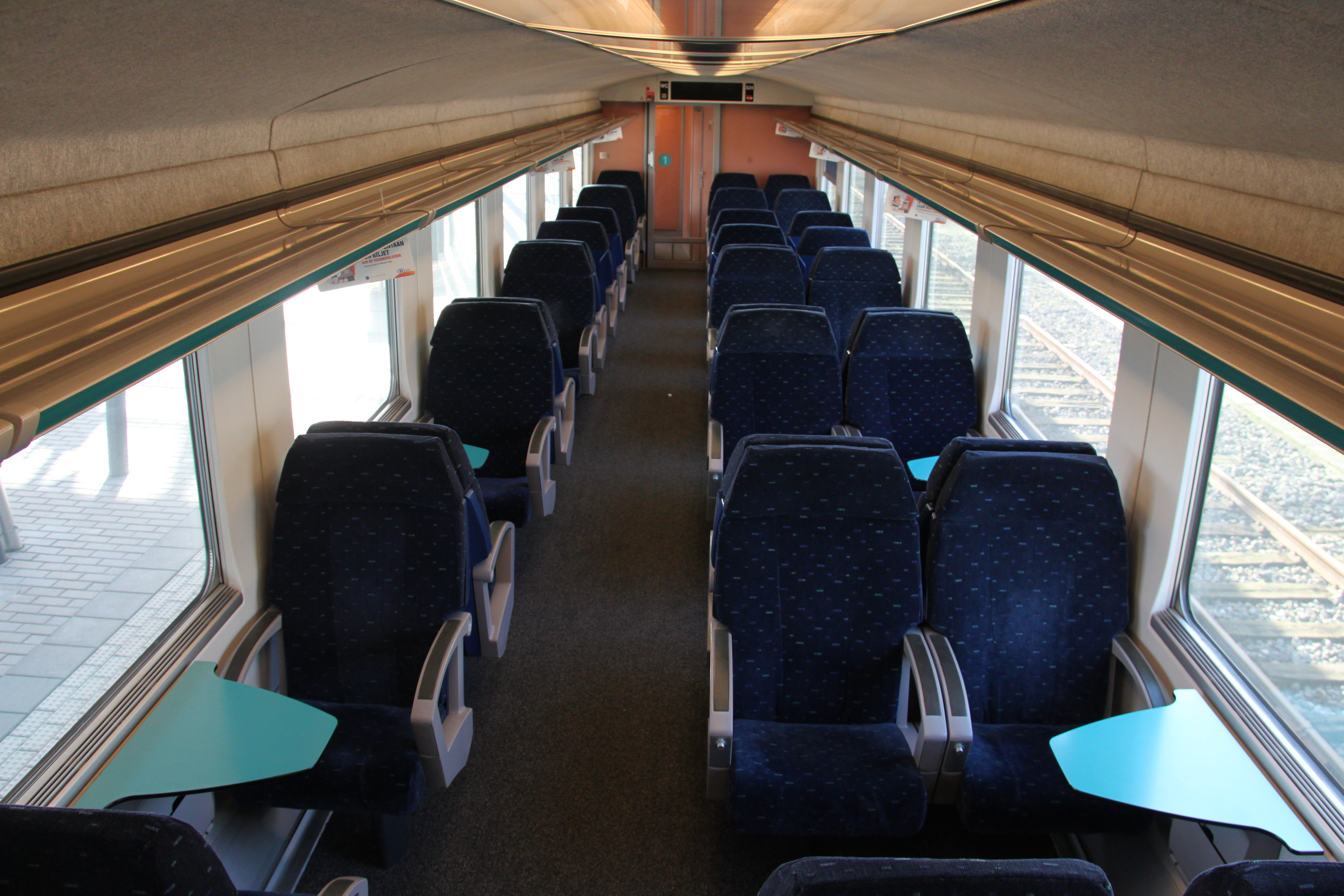
MS96 Interior first class

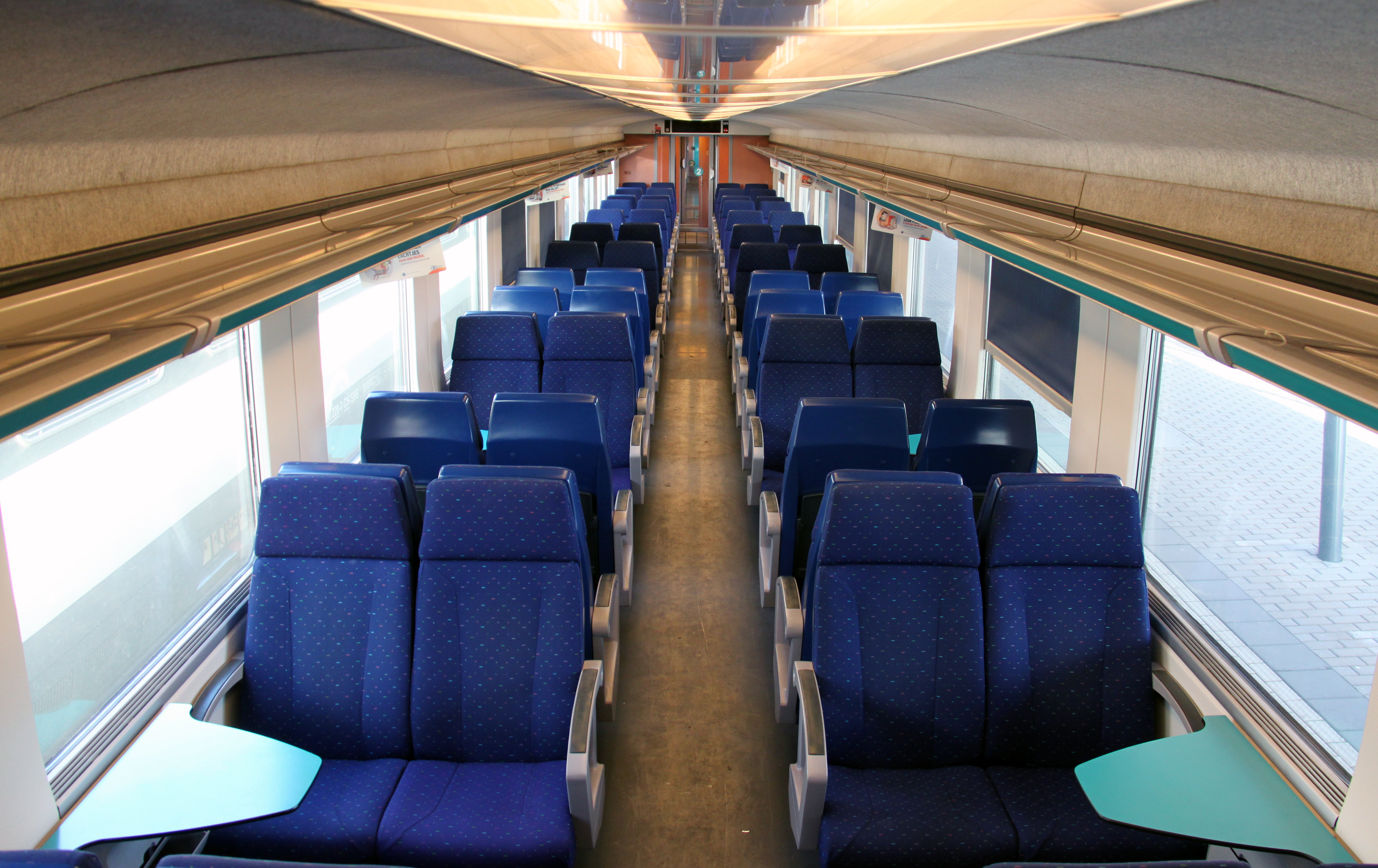
MS96 Interior second class

== Interior ==
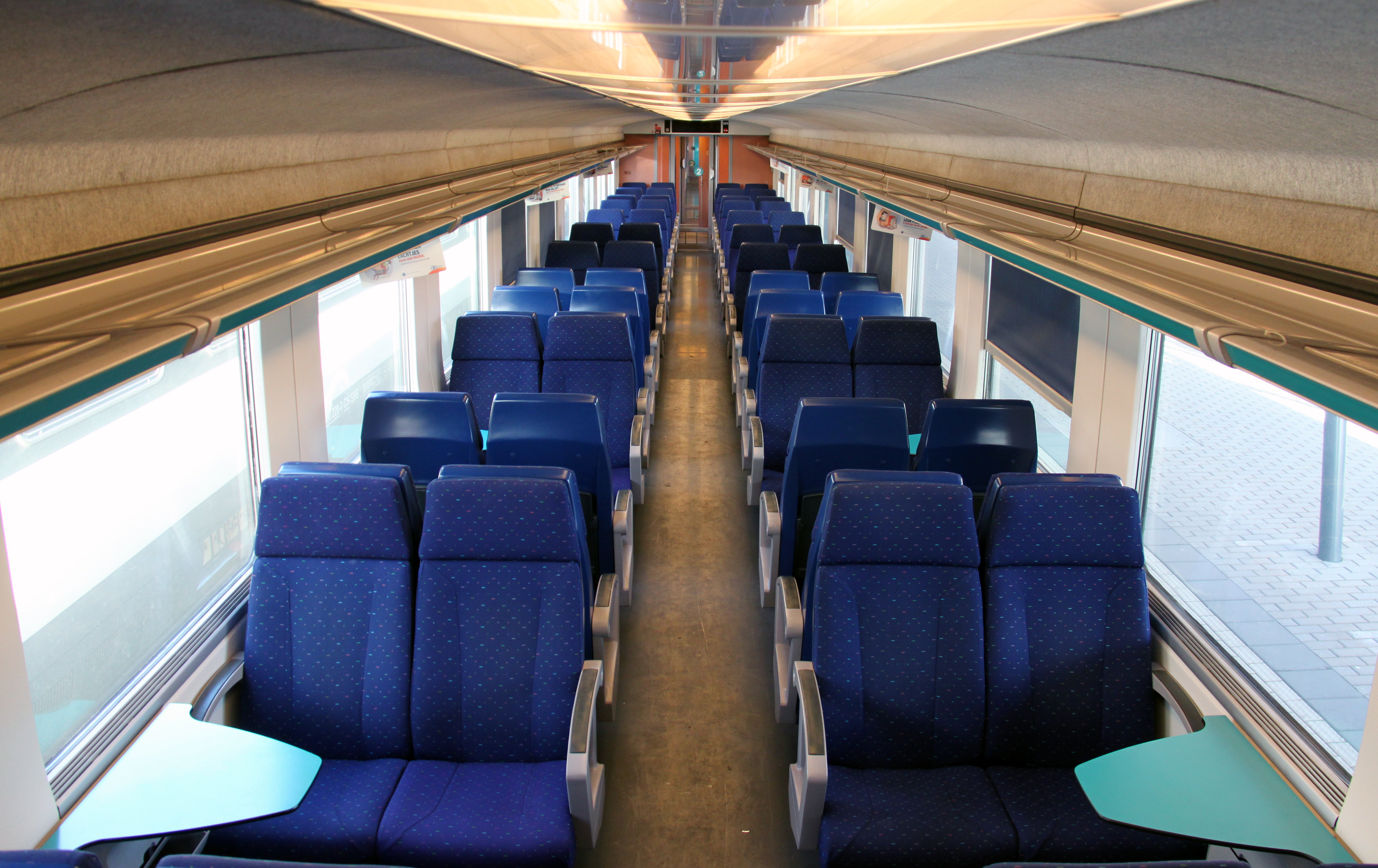
MS96 Interior second class

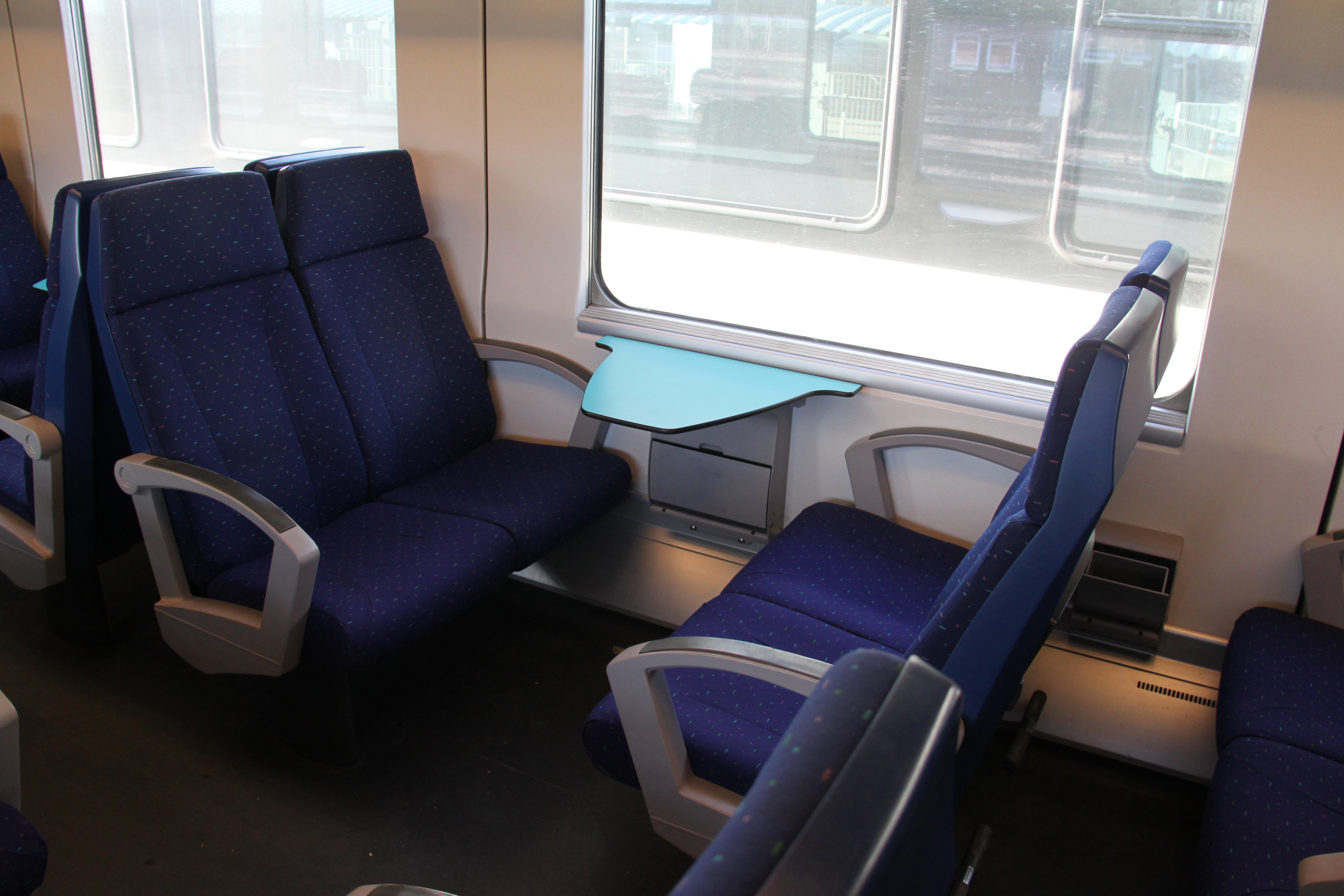
Second class interior

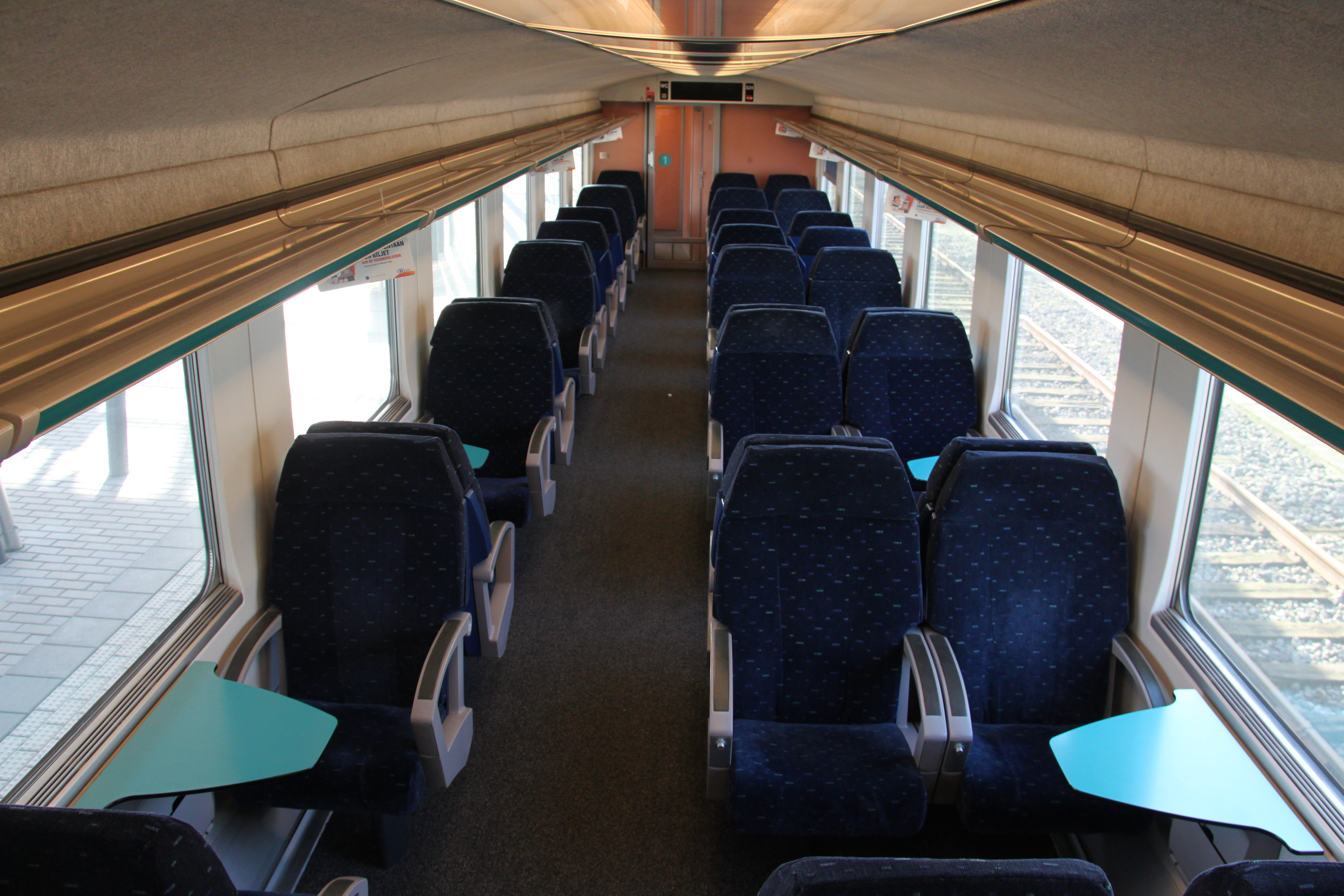
First class interior

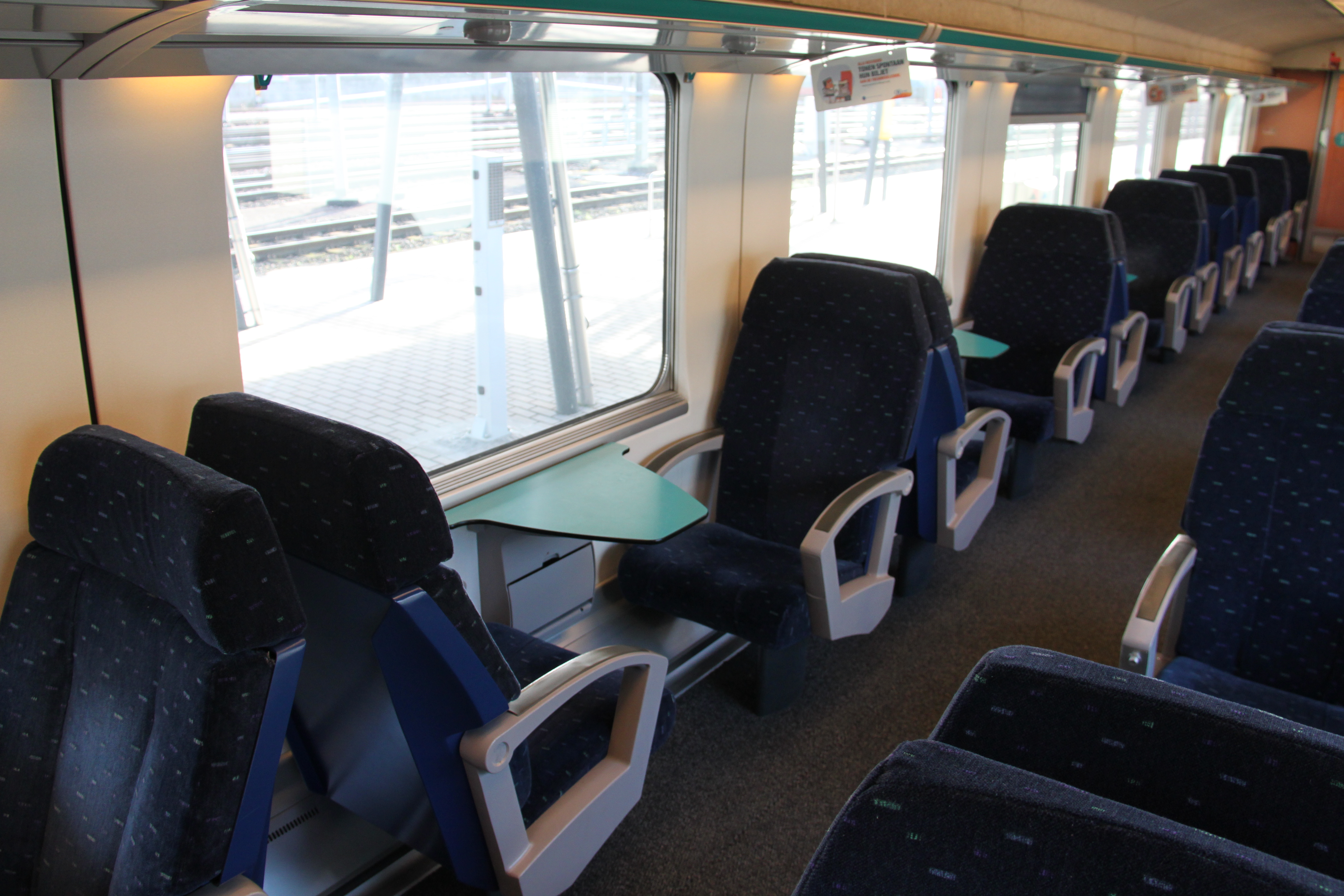
First class interior

== Accidents and incidents ==
- On 5 June 2016, two units forming a passenger train were involved in a rear-end collision with a freight train at Hermalle-sous-Huy. Three people were killed and about 40 were injured. Unit 548 was at the front of the train, unit 461 was at the rear of the train.

- On 27 November 2017, Unit 449 collided with a car on a level crossing at Morlanwelz and was damaged by the consequent fire. It was the leading unit of a train formed of units 449 and 442. During recovery operations, the unit broke free from the train and ran away, killing two people and seriously injuring two more. After travelling for 14 kilometres (8.7 mi), it collided at Strépy-Bracquegnies with a passenger train operated by two Class 96s including unit 483. Five people were injured in that collision.
