= List of protected heritage sites in Morlanwelz =

This table shows an overview of the protected heritage sites in the Walloon town Morlanwelz. This list is part of Belgium's national heritage.

Object	Year/architect	Town/section	Address	Coordinates	Number^{?}	Image
Priory of Montaigu and the chestnut trees along the rue de la Reunion ^{(nl)} ^{(fr)}		Morlanwelz		50.462533°N 4.250124°E	56087-CLT-0003-01 Info	Priorij de Montaigu en kastanjebomen langs de rue de la Réunion
Birthplace of Alexandre-Louis Martin ^{(nl)} ^{(fr)}		Morlanwelz	rue Saint-Eloi, n°89	50.445241°N 4.244374°E	56087-CLT-0004-01 Info	Geboortehuis van Alexandre-Louis Martin
The nursery, maternity ward and the orphanage is on the "plateau de Warocqué" ^{(nl)} ^{(fr)}		Morlanwelz	rue de l'Enseignement, n°s 2-4-6	50.460113°N 4.245956°E	56087-CLT-0005-01 Info	
Facades and roofs of the maternity ward, nursery and the tower of the orphanage on the "plateau de Warocqué" ^{(nl)} ^{(fr)}		Morlanwelz		50.460108°N 4.246249°E	56087-CLT-0007-01 Info	
Gardens of Mariemont and the drive to the park and the gardens ^{(nl)} ^{(fr)}		Morlanwelz	chaussée de Mariemont 100	50.476791°N 4.245050°E	56087-CLT-0008-01 Info	De dreef, het park en de tuinen van Mariemont
Hall and protection ^{(nl)} ^{(fr)}		Morlanwelz		50.456248°N 4.242034°E	56087-CLT-0009-01 Info	Stadhuis en beschermingszone
The park and double entry of Mariemont park ^{(nl)} ^{(fr)}		Morlanwelz		50.476791°N 4.245050°E	56087-PEX-0001-01 Info	Het park en dubbele toegang van domein van Mariemont

== See also ==
- List of protected heritage sites in Hainaut (province)
- Morlanwelz
