= Morlanwelz train collision and runaway =

2017 railway incident in Belgium

Coordinates: 50.4741°N 4.1266°E

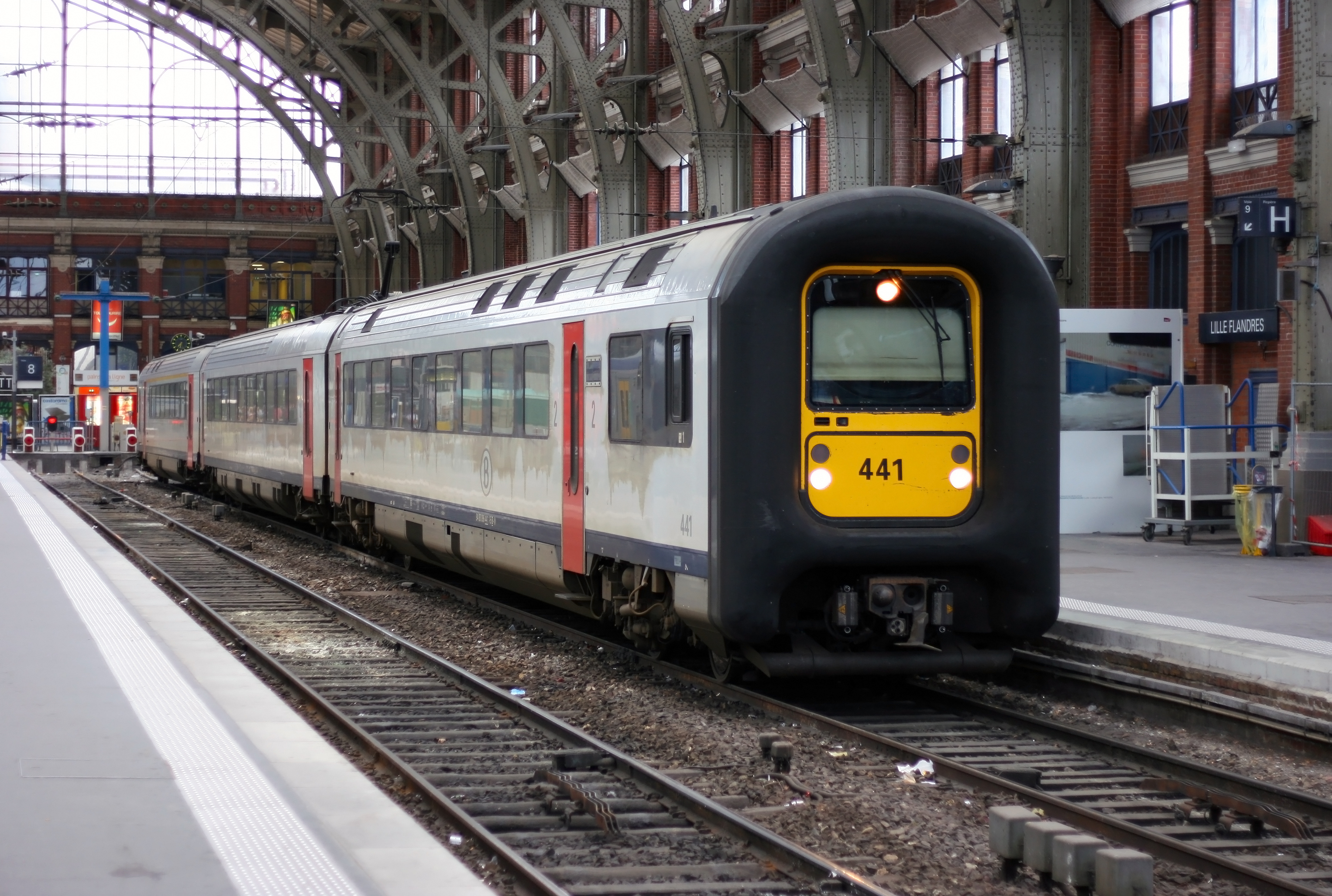
- The trains involved were Class AM96s, similar to this one.

- Location within Belgium

Details
- Date: 27 November 2017; 07:25 CET (06:25 UTC) - first collision. ~20:00 CET - runaway ~20:20 - second collision
- Location: Morlanwelz, Hainaut, Belgium - initial collision Piéton, Hainaut - runaway Strépy-Bracquegnies, Hainaut - second collision
- Country: Belgium
- Line: Mons - Charleroi
- Operator: SNCB
- Incident type: Obstruction on line, subsequent runaway and collision
- Cause: Under investigation

Statistics
- Trains: 1 (Morlanwelz, Piéton); 2 (Strépy-Bracquegnies)
- Deaths: 2 (runaway)
- Injured: 2 (runaway); 5 (second collision)

On 27 November 2017, a Belgian passenger train ran away during recovery operations following a collision at a level crossing. After 14 kilometres (8.7 mi), it collided with a stationary train at Strépy-Bracquegnies, killing two and injuring seven. The accident was caused by a failed coupling.

== Accidents ==
=== Level crossing ===
At 07:25 CET (06:25 UTC) on 27 November 2017, a passenger train collided with a car on a level crossing at Morlanwelz, Hainaut, Belgium. A fire broke out, damaging the leading carriage of Class AM96 electric multiple unit 449, which formed the passenger train with unit 442. The driver of the car had managed to escape from the vehicle before it was hit by the train. There were no injuries on the train. The fire was quickly extinguished. A signal and 12 metres (39 ft) of track were damaged in the accident.

=== Runaway and collision ===
During recovery operations at about 20:00, the three carriages of unit 449 were detached from unit 442 train at Piéton. The unit ran away towards La Louvière, subsequently striking four Infrabel employees who were repairing the track at Morlanwelz, 4 kilometres (2.5 mi) from Piéton. Two were killed and two were seriously injured. An attempt to stop the train by cutting the power supply was unsuccessful. The train continued to run away and then collided with another passenger train at Strépy-Bracquegnies at about 20:20, having passed through three stations and over five level crossings and travelling for 14 kilometres (8.7 mi). The second train involved was formed of two Class AM96 units, including unit 483. Five people were injured.

== Aftermath ==
The railway was closed and a bus replacement service was put in place between Charleroi-South and Mons. The line was subsequently scheduled to remain closed between Oubourg and Charleroi-South on 29 November. The line between La Louvière-Sud and Charleroi-South reopened on 30 November, leaving the section between La Louvière-Sud and Mons closed whilst repairs were made. That section reopened to traffic on 4 December.

== Investigations ==
A research institution opened an investigation into the accidents. Investigations were also opened by SNCB, Infrabel and the Judiciary. It was originally reported that the coupling failed between units 442 and 449, which caused the runaway.
