= Mont-Sainte-Aldegonde =

Coordinates: 50°26′N 4°14′E

Mont-Sainte-Aldegonde (French pronunciation: [mɔ̃ sɛ̃t aldəɡɔ̃d]; Walloon: Li Mont) is a village of Wallonia and a district of the municipality of Morlanwelz, located in the province of Hainaut, Belgium.
