= Raoul Warocqué =

Belgian industrialist (1870–1917)

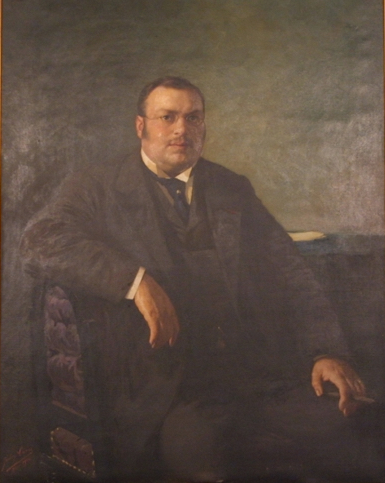
- Portrait of Raoul Warocqué
- Born: 4 February 1870; Brussels, Belgium
- Died: 28 May 1917 (aged 47); Brussels, Belgium
- Occupations: Industrialist, politician, philanthropist
- Known for: Founding the Musée royal de Mariemont

Raoul Warocqué (Brussels, 4 February 1870 – Brussels, 28 May 1917) was a Belgian industrialist and politician associated with the Liberal Party.

== Biography ==
Raoul was the great-grandson of Nicolas Warocqué, the founder of the prominent Warocqué family. His father was Arthur Warocqué, (1835–80), a promoter of Belgian horticulture, after whom the arum Anthurium warocqueanum was named. His brother was Georges Warocqué (1860-1899).

Warocqué was a philanthropist and a believer in paternalism. He was a freemason of the Grand Orient of Belgium, Belgian patriot and a royalist. At the Free University of Brussels (Université libre de Bruxelles, ULB), he participated in the Jeune Garde libérale (Young Liberal Guard).

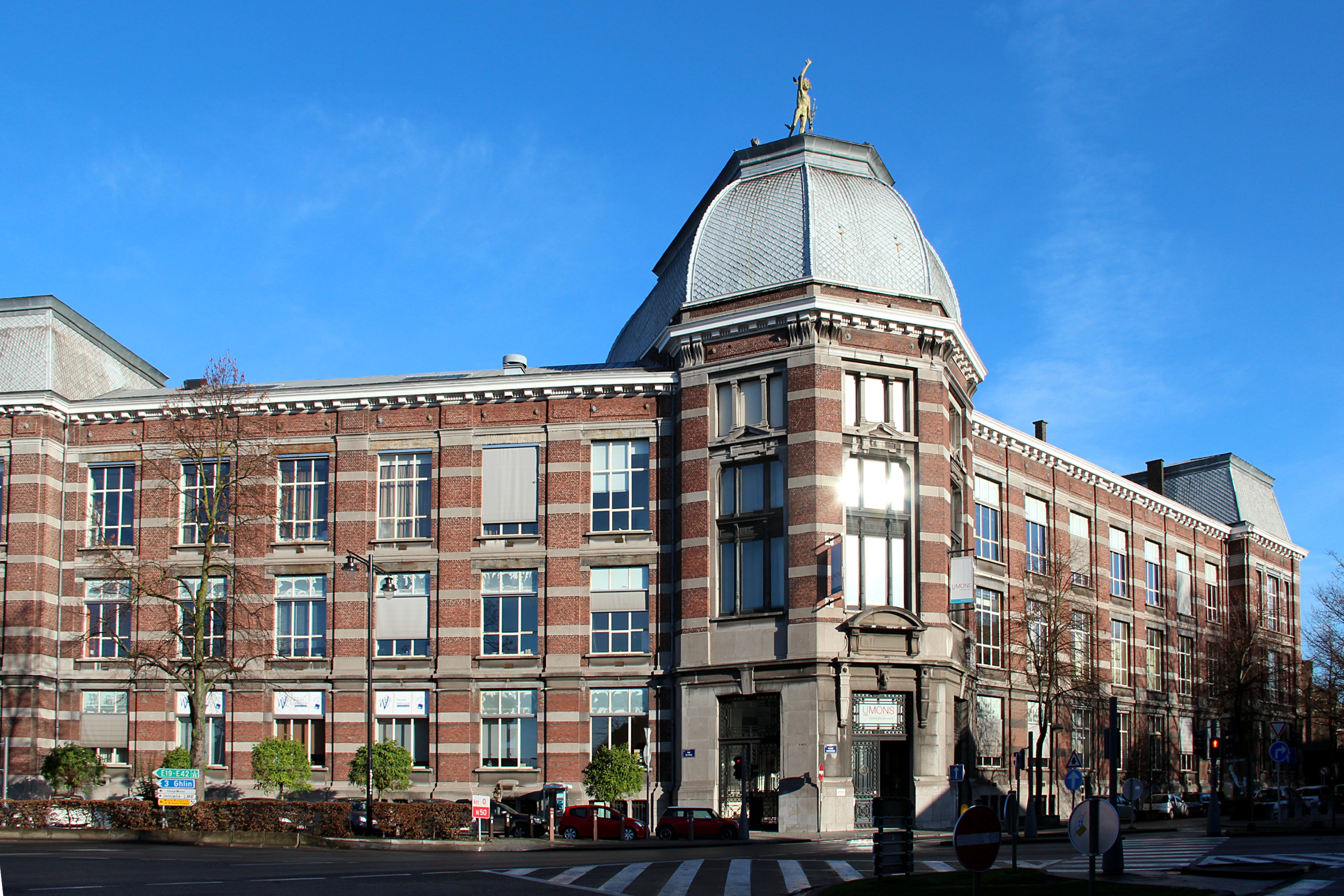
Building of the former École de Commerce in Mons which Warocqué founded

Raoul Warocqué made the coal mines of Mariemont successful, and at 21 years of age had established a considerable fortune. A careful investment policy made him the richest man in Belgium at the beginning of the 20th century. His industrial ventures were numerous, such as in the coal mines of Campine as well as in other industrial sectors including Clabecq, Gas and Electricity of Hainaut, railroads and coal mines in China, tobacco in Portugal, and others.

As a politician he was mayor of Morlanwelz and liberal deputy of Thuin. In Mariemont and in Hainaut, he founded liberal organizations. He supported bills favorable to the working class, while at the same time he was opposed to the right to strike. His most noted interventions relate to the Belgian Congo, military service, compulsory education and coal mining.

As a philanthropist, he created open dormitories in Brussels (1891) which distributed soup and bread to the poor. He supported the ULB, the Ecole des Mines (School of Mining), and founded the Institut commercial (Commercial Institute) in Mons as well as the Athénée du Centre (Central Athenaeum) in Morlanwelz, an orphanage, a childcare facility, a maternity hospital, and some other institutions.

He was also one of the financiers of the World Fair of Brussels (1897 and 1910) and of Charleroi (1911). He fell ill and died during World War I, in 1917. On his death in 1917, his art and antiquities collections were donated to the Belgian state and now form the basis for the Musée royal de Mariemont.
