= 2022 Strépy-Bracquegnies car crash =

2022 road incident in Belgium

- Location: 50.465°N 4.115°E; Strépy-Bracquegnies, Belgium
- Date: 20 March 2022
- Weapon: Car
- Deaths: 6
- Injuries: 40
- Motive: Unknown
- Charges: Manslaughter

In the morning of 20 March 2022, a motorist drove a car through a crowd celebrating Carnival in Strépy-Bracquegnies, La Louvière, Belgium. Six people were killed and around 40 were wounded, with ten of the wounded people having very serious or even potentially fatal injuries.

A crowd of 150–200 people were parading towards the centre of the village, dressed up in costumes in celebration of Carnival when the car collided with the crowd in the rue des Canadiens. A TV presenter said that the vehicle "deliberately entered" the crowd, killing several people. After crashing into the crowd, the car, which was carrying two people, sped off from the scene; later being stopped by police.

Six people in total were killed, including Frédéric d'Andrea, a steward for the RAAL La Louvière football club.

Police denied early reports that the vehicle had been engaging in a "high-speed chase" at the time. While a terrorist motive was ruled out, whether or not it was intentional was at first unclear.

Prime Minister Alexander De Croo said he was shocked by the incident and responded to it as "horrible news", and travelled to the village with Philippe of Belgium that day. French President Emmanuel Macron also expressed his sorrow and expressed empathy to Belgium.

The driver was charged with manslaughter a few days later. He confessed he had exceeded the speed limit when the crash occurred, and insisted that what had happened was an accident. Investigation indicated that the driver had been going 160 km/h while under the influence and using his mobile phone. The case came to trial in Mons in April 2026. The driver was sentenced to 27 years.

== Fatal victims ==
- Mario Cascarano, (56 years old)
- Michelina Imperiale (54 years old)
- Salvatore Imperiale (56 years old)
- Frédéric (Fred) Cicero (42 years old)
- Laure Gara (49 years old)
- Frédéric D'Andrea (46 years old)
