= Musée royal de Mariemont =

Museum in Belgium

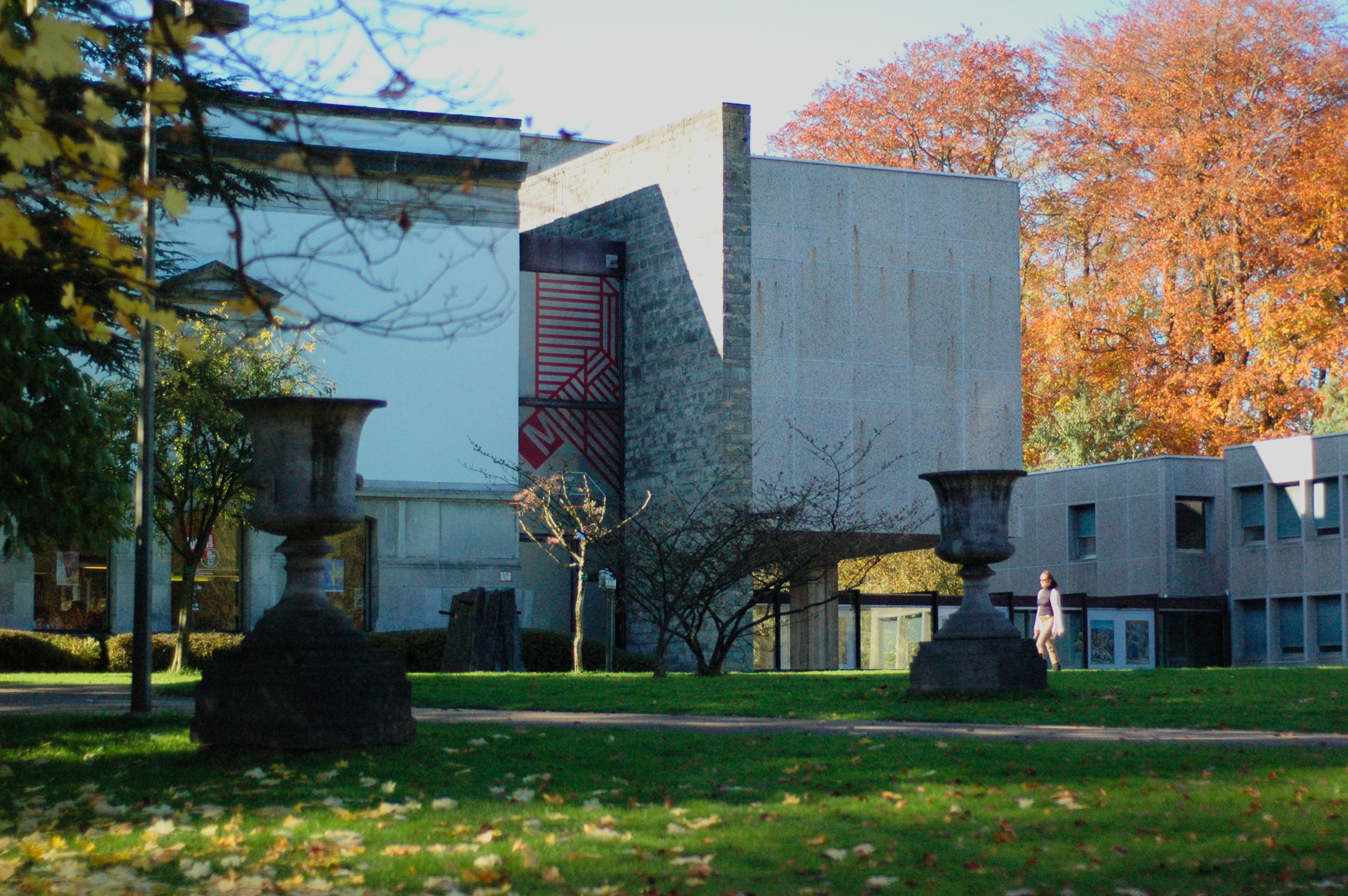
- View of the museum's main building

- Location within Belgium
- Location: Chaussée de Mariemont 100; B-7140 Morlanwelz, Belgium
- Coordinates: 50.467739°N 4.232756°E
- Website: www.musee-mariemont.be

The Royal Museum of Mariemont (French: Musée royal de Mariemont) is a museum situated in Mariemont, near Morlanwelz, in Belgium. It is constituted around the personal collection of art and antiquities owned by the industrialist Raoul Warocqué (1870–1917), which were bequeathed to the Belgian state on his death.

== Museum and collection ==
The museum displays a notable collection of Tournai porcelain and books, as well as antiquities from Ancient Greece, Ancient Egypt, Ancient Rome, Judaism and the Christian Near East, and the Far East. In 2012, the museum was expanded by a bequest of Pre-Columbian art from the collection of Yves and Yolande Boël. Artefacts from archaeological excavations in the Province of Hainaut are also displayed.

The original Château Warocqué, in which the museum was housed, was destroyed by fire in 1960. The current museum is housed in a building designed by the architect Roger Bastin, which was opened in 1975.

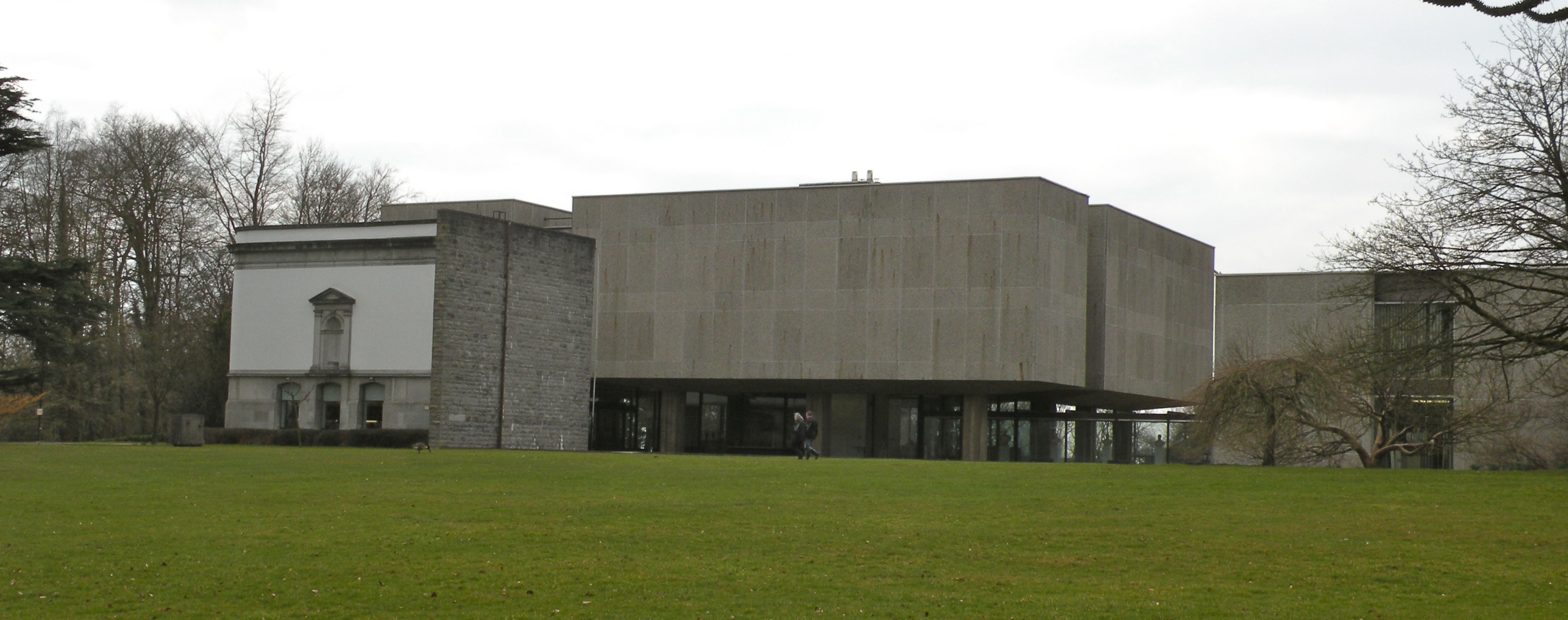
View of the museum building, including the small section of the original Château which survived the fire of 1960

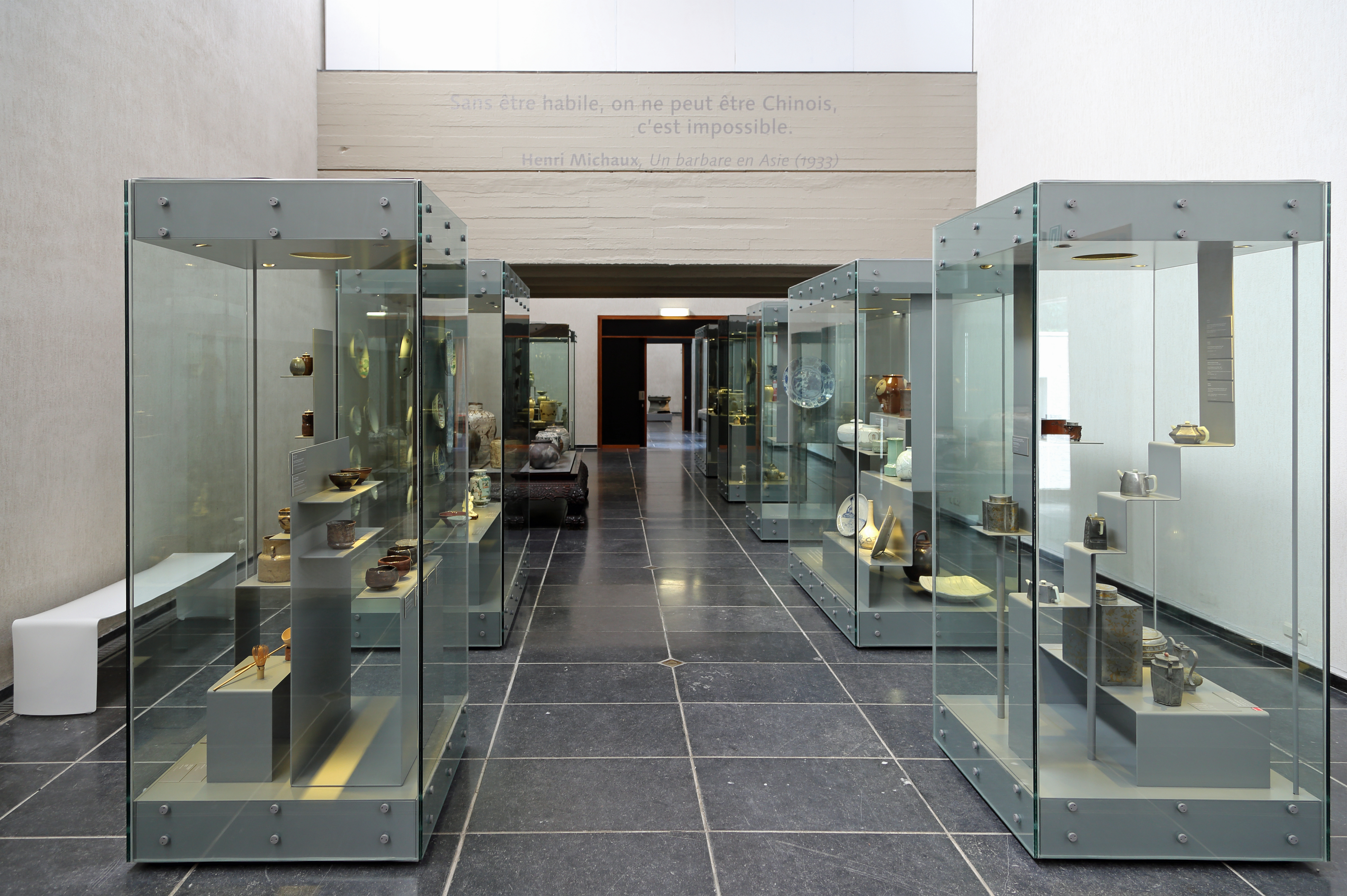
One of the museum's galleries, holding Chinese antiquities

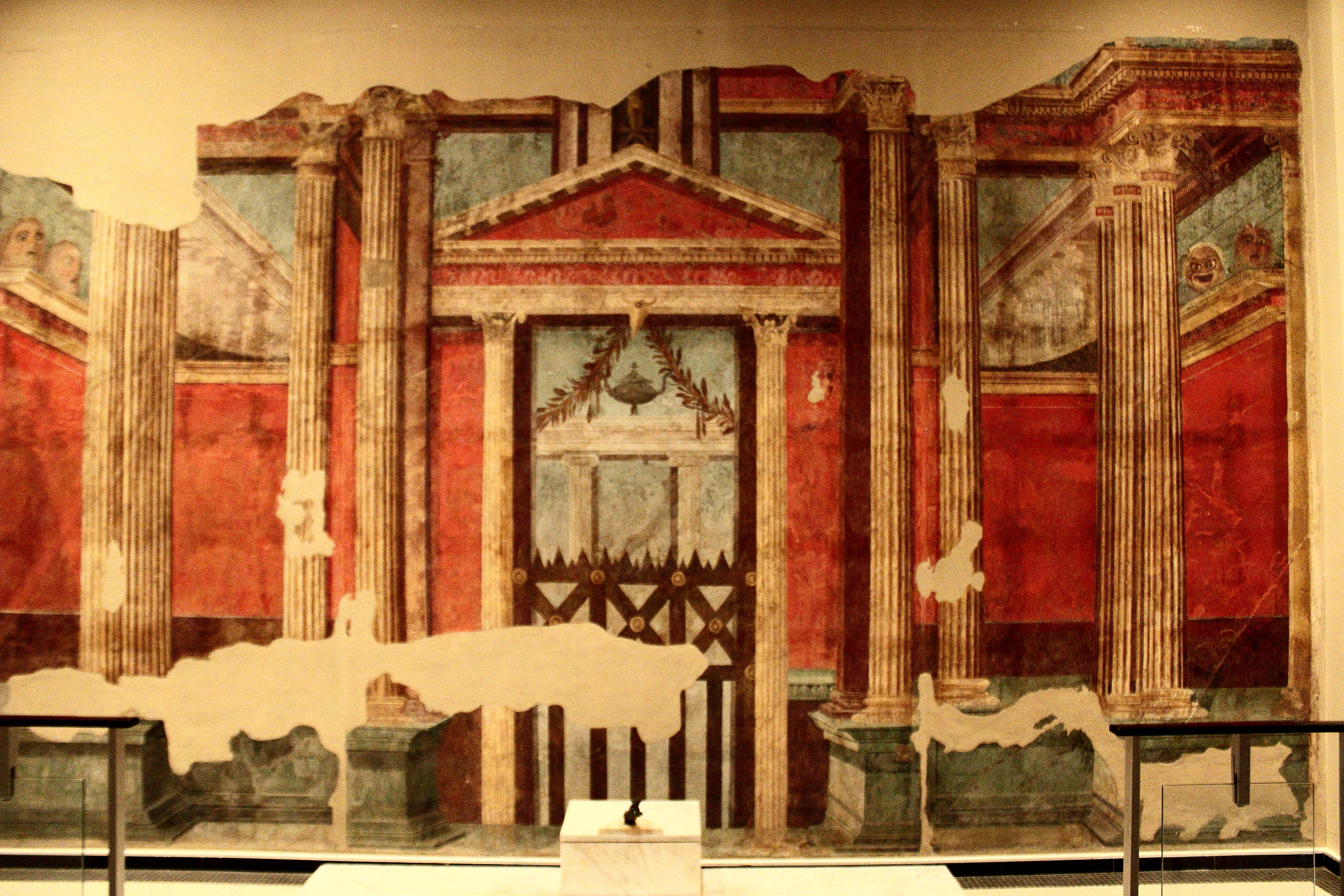
Roman frescos from Boscoreale, Italy

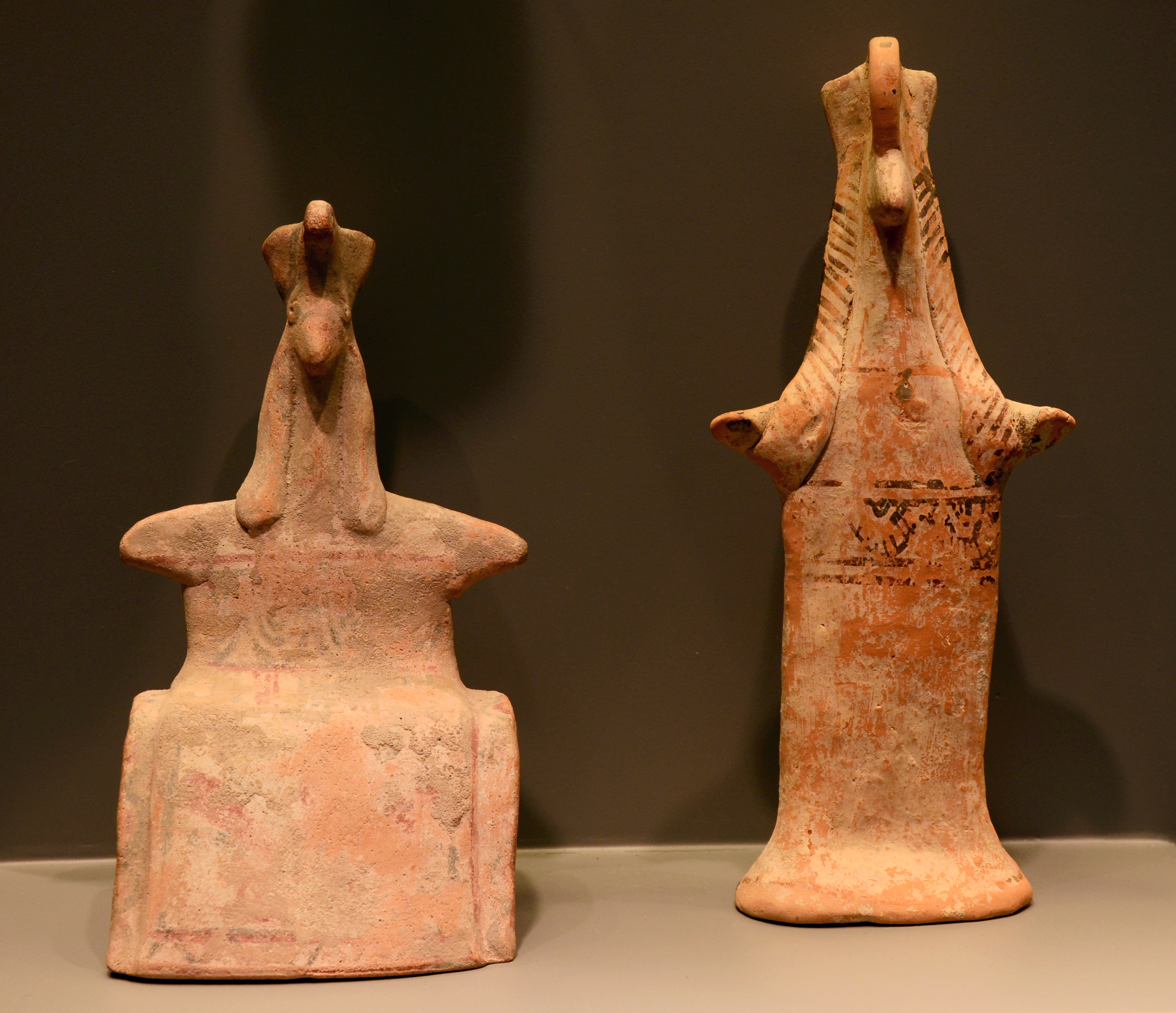
Ancient Greek statuettes
