= Strépy-Bracquegnies =

Section of La Louvière, Belgium

Coordinates: 50.481111°N 4.115591°E

Strépy-Bracquegnies (French pronunciation: [stʁepi bʁakɲi]; Walloon: Sterpi-Bracgnere) is a village in Wallonia, Belgium. It is a district of the municipality of La Louvière in the province of Hainaut. It is around 6 km west of the centre of La Louvière, and around 50 km south-west of Brussels.

== See also ==
- Morlanwelz train collision and runaway
- Strépy-Thieu boat lift
- Thieu
- 2022 Strépy-Bracquegnies car crash

== Gallery ==
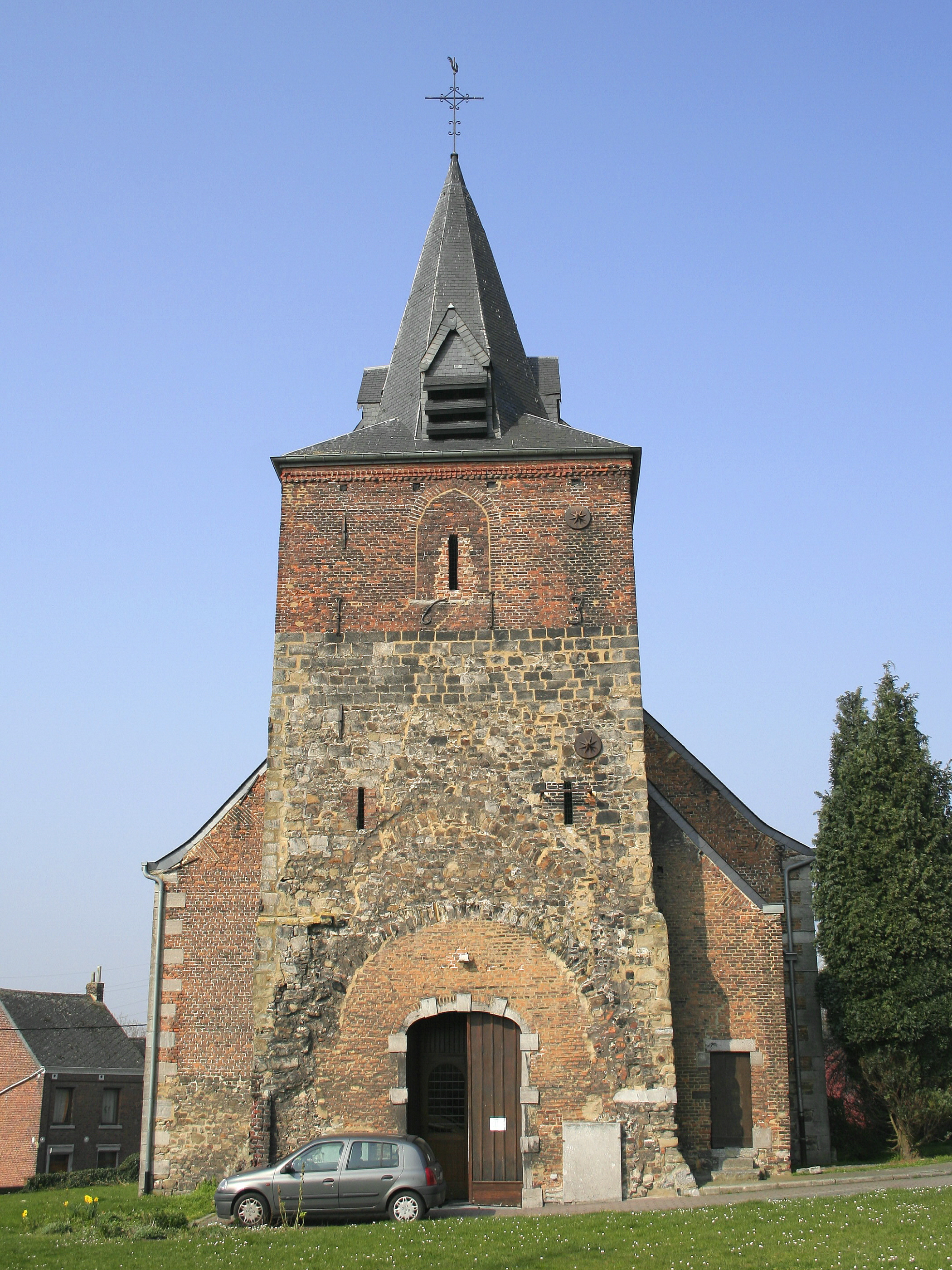
The Church of Saint-Martin (1769)

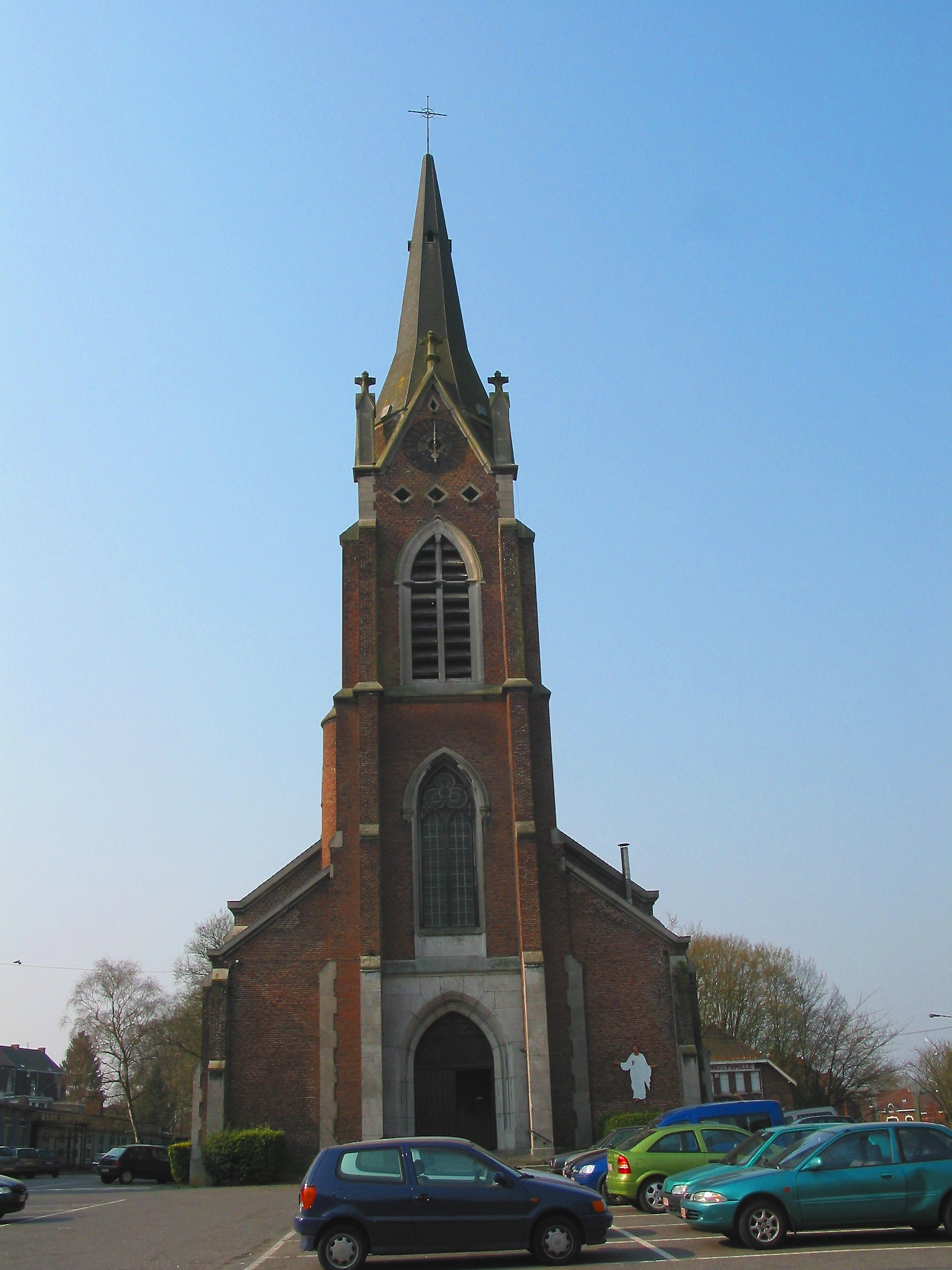
The Church of Saint-Joseph

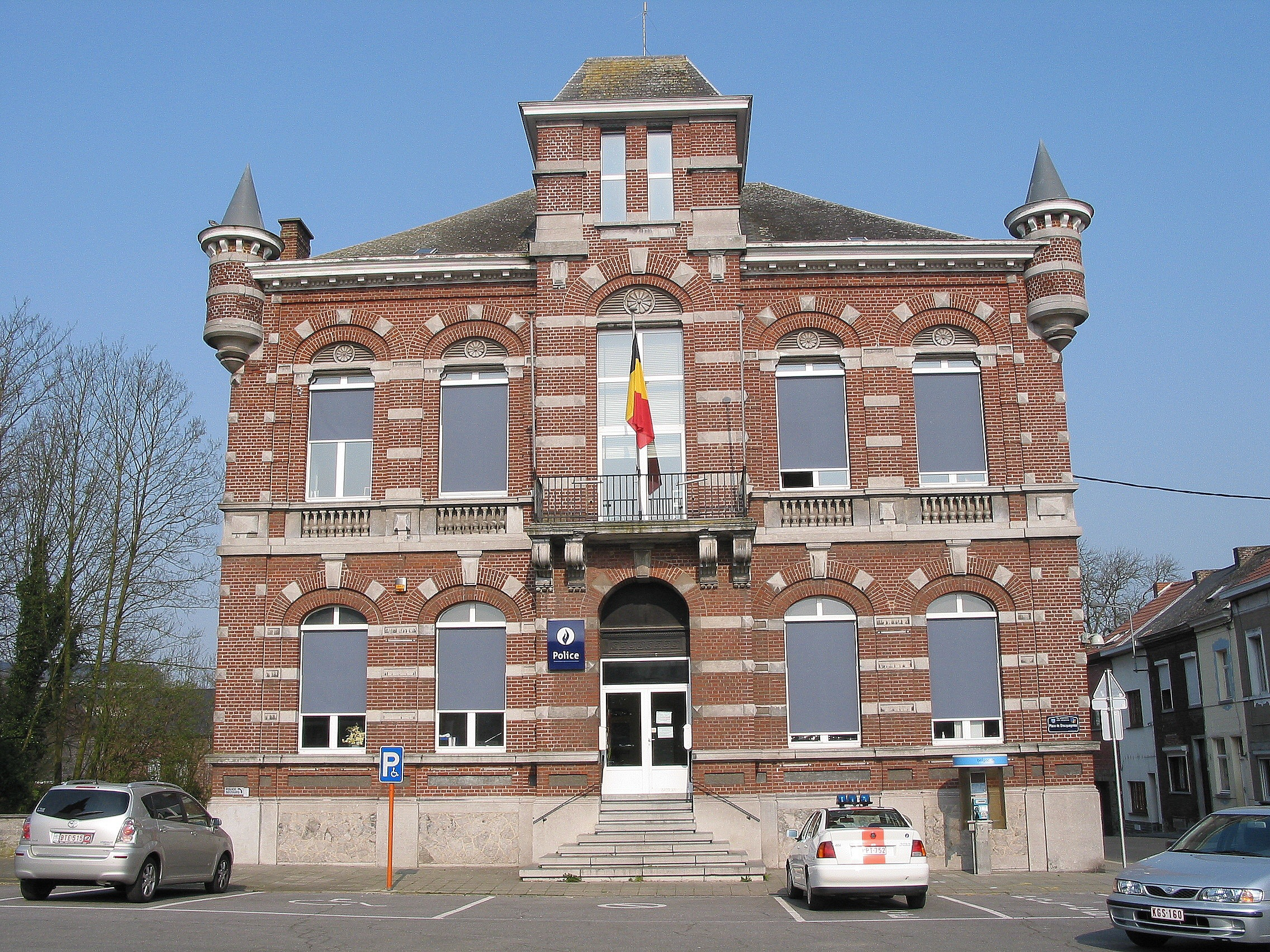
The former city hall

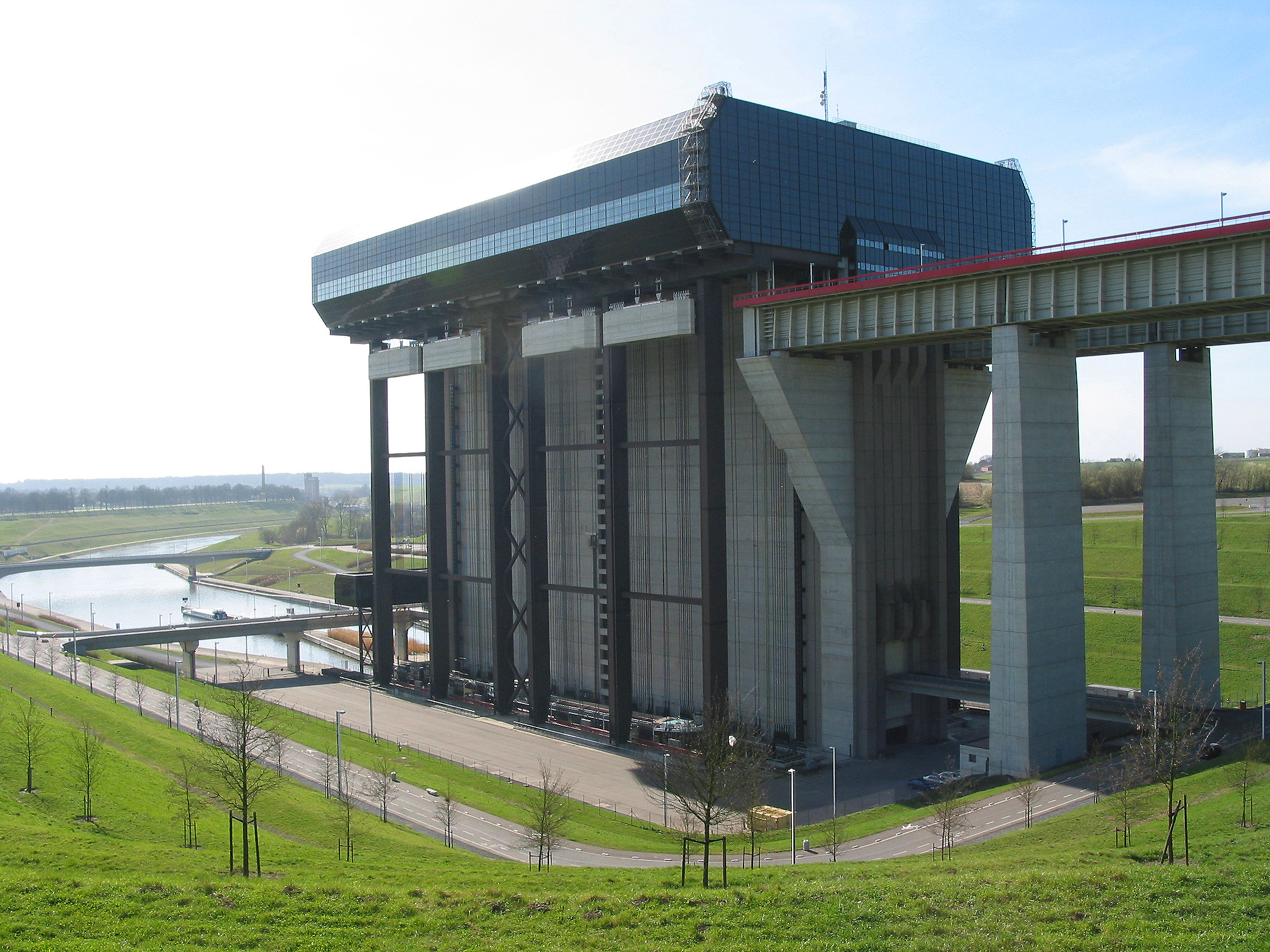
The biggest ship elevator in Europe
