= Morlanwelz =

Municipality in Hainaut Province, Wallonia, Belgium

Morlanwelz Marlanwé (Walloon)
- Municipality
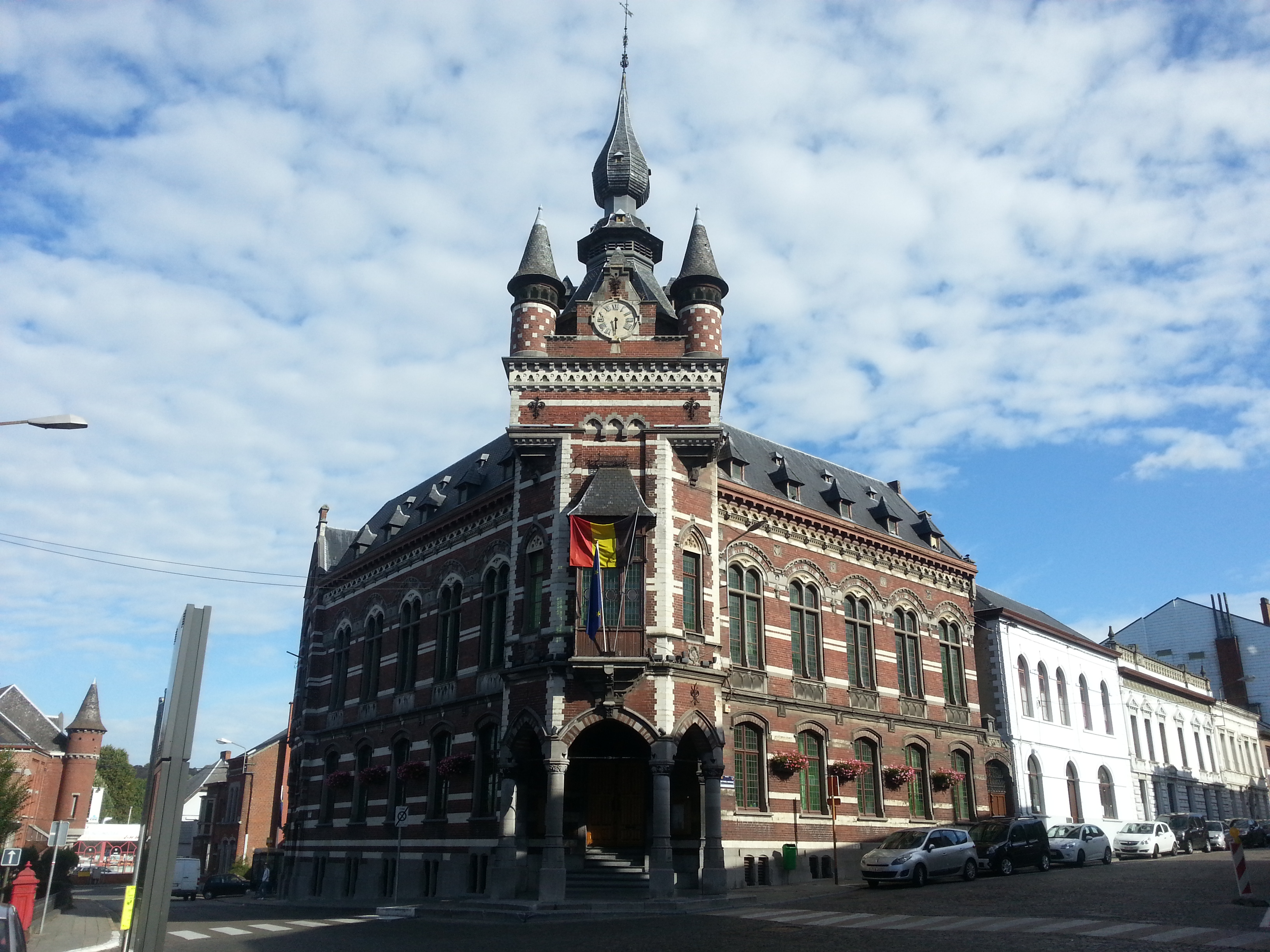
- Morlanwelz town hall

- Flag Coat of arms

- Location of Morlanwelz in Hainaut
- Interactive map of Morlanwelz
- Location in Belgium
- Coordinates: 50°27′N 04°14′E
- Country: Belgium
- Community: French Community
- Region: Wallonia
- Province: Hainaut
- Arrondissement: La Louvière

Government
  - Mayor: Jean-Charles Deneufbourg
  - Governing party: PS

Area
  - Total: 20.38 km^{2} (7.87 sq mi)

Population (2026-01-01)
  - Total: 19,143
  - Density: 939.3/km^{2} (2,433/sq mi)
- Postal codes: 7140, 7141
- NIS code: 58004
- Area codes: 064
- Website: www.morlanwelz.be

Morlanwelz (French pronunciation: [mɔʁlɑ̃we]; Walloon: Marlanwé) is a municipality of Wallonia located in the province of Hainaut, Belgium.

On 1 January 2006 Morlanwelz had a total population of 18,595. The total area is 20.26 km^{2} which gives a population density of 918 inhabitants per km^{2}. Its postcode is 7140.

The municipality consists of the following districts: Carnières, Mont-Sainte-Aldegonde, and Morlanwelz-Mariemont.

== Sister cities ==
- Villarosa, Italy (2002)
- Le Quesnoy, France
- Pleszew, Poland
- Blaj, Romania

== Notable people of Morlanwelz ==
Born in Morlanwelz:

- Elio Di Rupo (1951), Former Minister, Walloon President and Member of the European Parliament.
- Arthur Warocqué (1835–1880), industrialist and promoter of Belgian horticulture after whom the arum Anthurium warocqueanum was named.

Resided in Morlanwelz:

- Raoul Warocqué (1870–1917), Belgian industrialist and Mayor of Morlanwelz (1900–1917)
- Marino Stephano née Stéphane Marino (1974–1999), Belgian Trance music producer and DJ.

== Image gallery ==
Parc de Mariemont

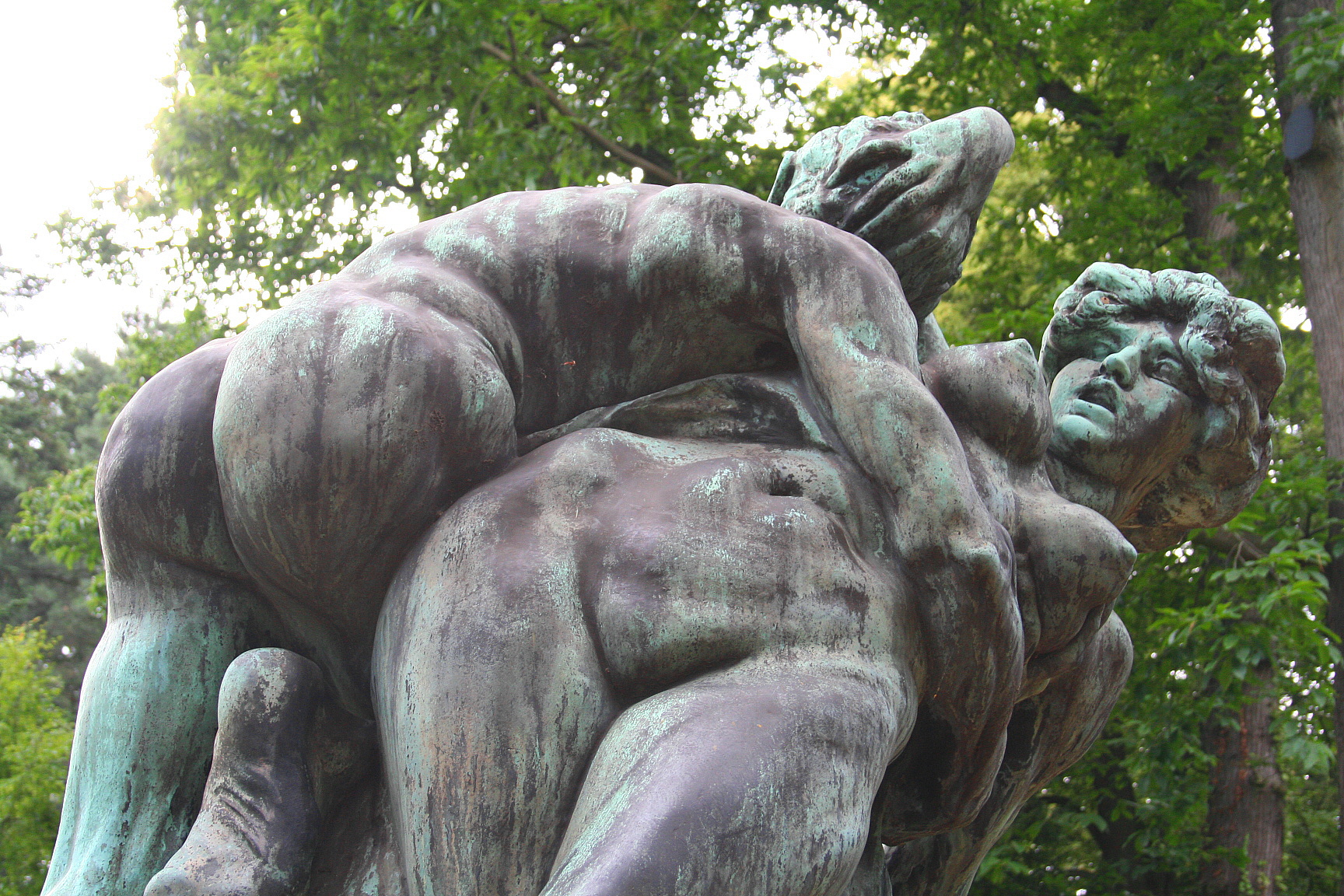

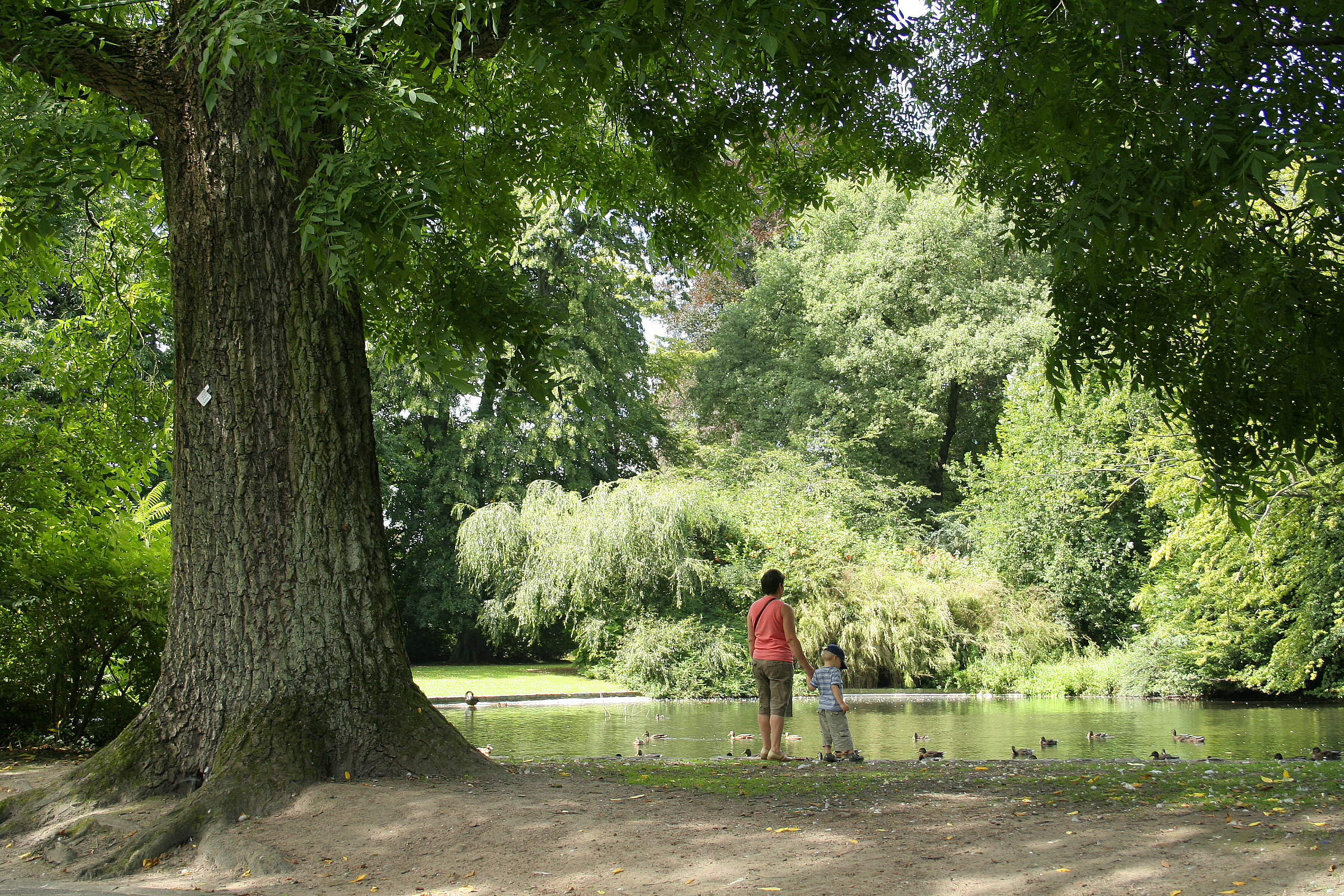

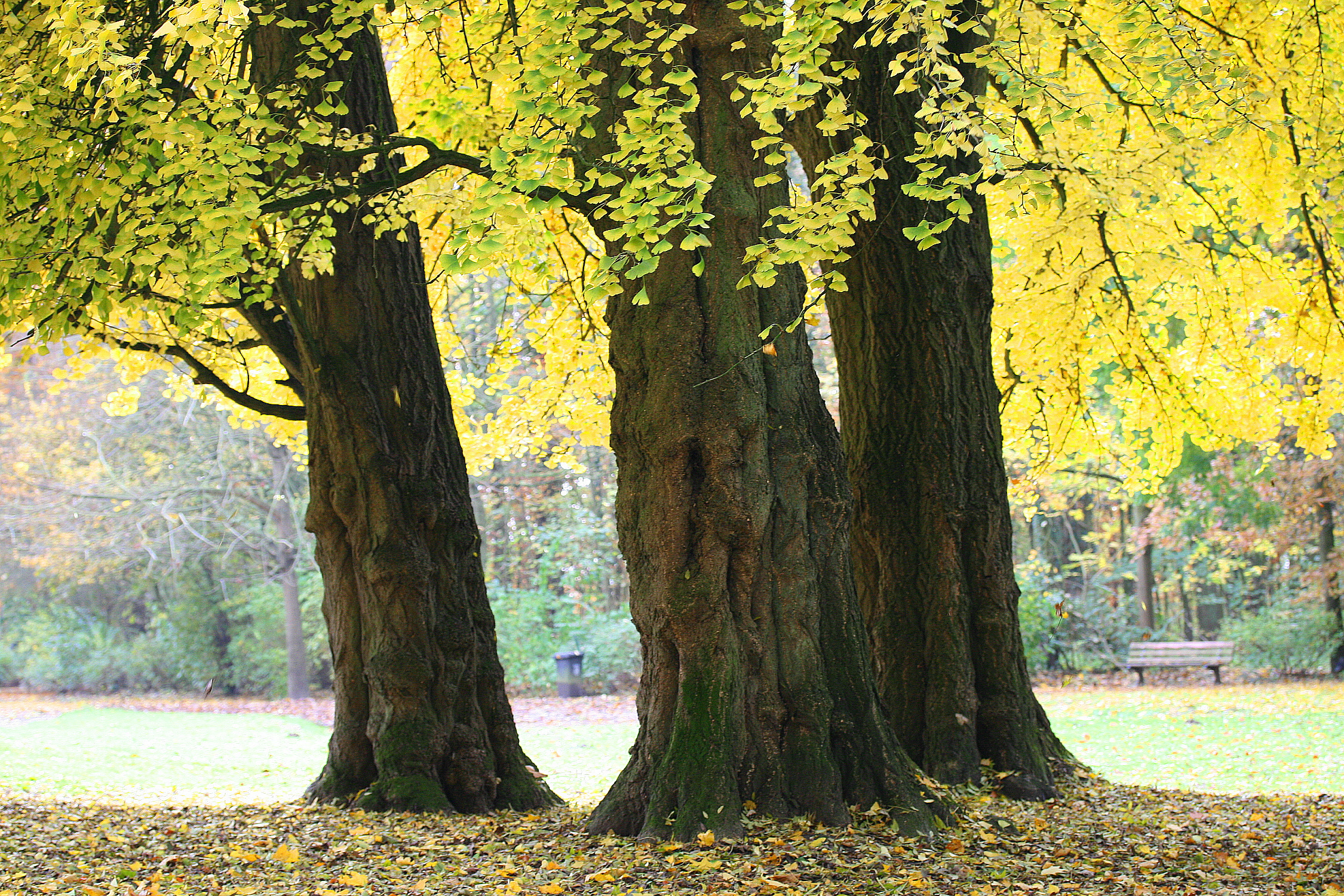

== See also ==
- Morlanwelz train collision and runaway
- Musée royal de Mariemont
