= The Infanta Isabel Clara Eugenia in the Mariemont Park =

Painting by Joos de Momper

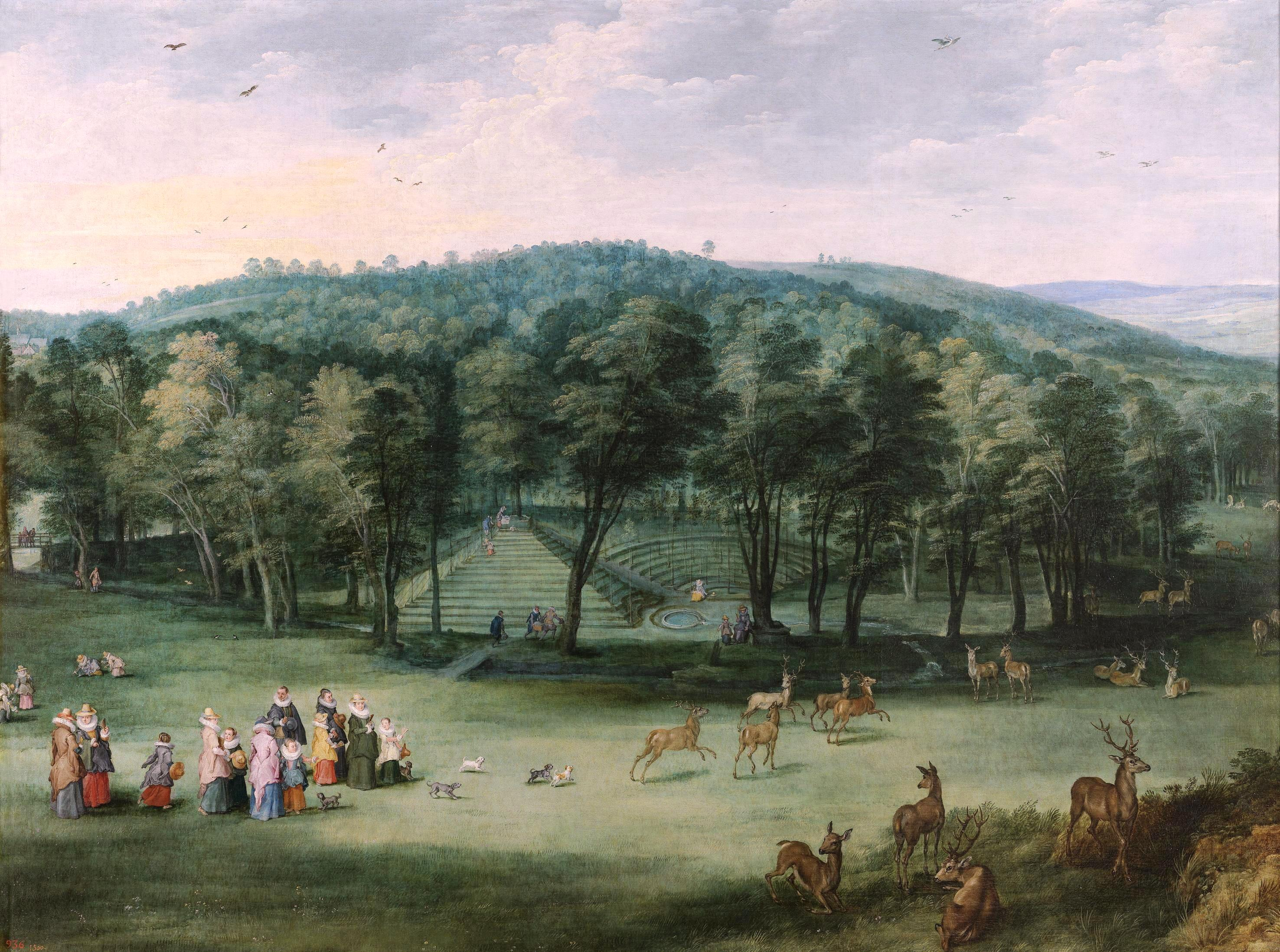
- Artist: Joos de Momper; Jan Brueghel the Elder
- Year: Early 17th century
- Catalogue: P001428
- Medium: Oil on canvas
- Dimensions: 176 cm × 236 cm (69.3 in × 92.9 in)
- Location: Museum of Prado; Madrid

The Infanta Isabel Clara Eugenia in the Mariemont Park (Spanish: La infanta Isabel Clara Eugenia en el parque de Mariemont) is a large oil on canvas painting by Flemish artists Jan Brueghel the Elder and Joos de Momper. It was painted in the first quarter of the 17th century. The painting is kept in the Museum of Prado in Madrid.

== Painting ==
The oeuvre was part of a collection of 26 paintings which arrived in Madrid in the early 17th century. Some of the paintings, hung in the Torre de la Reina at the Alcázar de Madrid, showed everyday activities of the people of Flanders; others portrayed the archdukes in their landed estates. There were four paintings in the latter group.

To the left there stand the dukes, surrounded by courtladies, children and small sized dogs. To the right there is a group of deer, chased by small sized dogs. The painting seems to represent hunting; however, it does so in a placid, unrealistic way: some deers are resting, and the small sized dogs are not of the breed generally used for hunting.

Differently from the Excursion in the Countryside of Infanta Isabel Clara Eugenia, also by Brueghel and de Momper, dating to the same period, part of the same set, and showing the same gardens in the archdukes' residence of Mariemont, the latter's palace is not visible in the background of this painting. A collection of letters between Isabel Clara Eugenia and the Duke of Lerma shows the former's passion for the life in the countryside. This painting was commissioned by the archduke out of her enthusiasm for such places.
