= Excursion in the Countryside of Infanta Isabel Clara Eugenia =

Painting by Joos de Momper

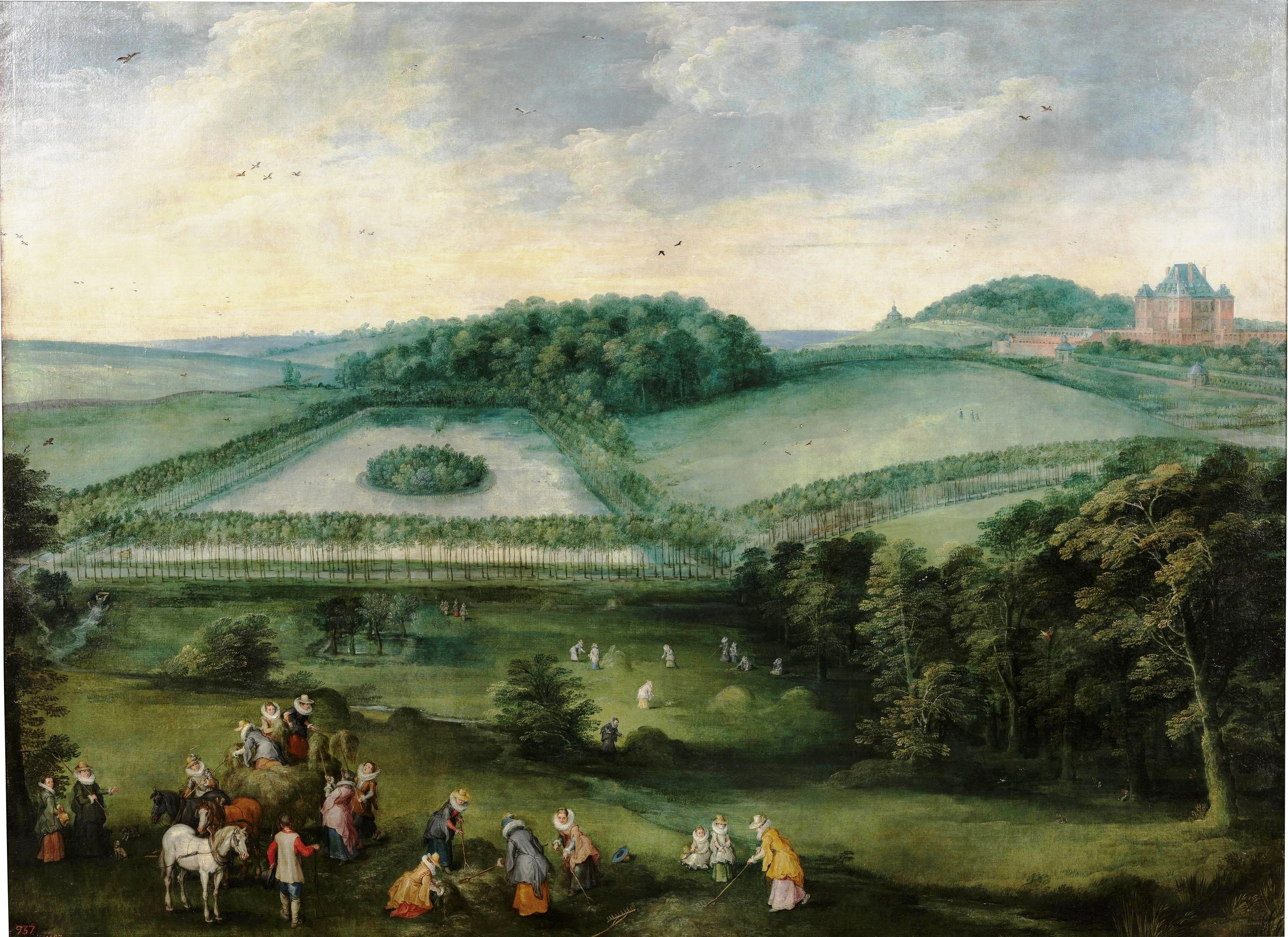
- Artist: Joos de Momper; Jan Brueghel the Elder
- Year: Early 17th century
- Catalogue: P001428
- Medium: Oil on canvas
- Dimensions: 176 cm × 238 cm (69.3 in × 93.7 in)
- Location: Museum of Prado; Madrid

Excursion in the Countryside of Infanta Isabel Clara Eugenia (Spanish: Excursión campestre de Isabel Clara Eugenia) is an oil on canvas painting by Flemish artists Jan Brueghel the Elder and Joos de Momper. It was painted in the first quarter of the 17th century, and is housed at the Museum of Prado, in Madrid.

== Painting ==
This landscape painting depicts Archduchess Isabel Clara Eugenia in the fields of her summer residence in Mariemont, close by Brussels. Isabella's opulent palace is visible in the upper right corner.

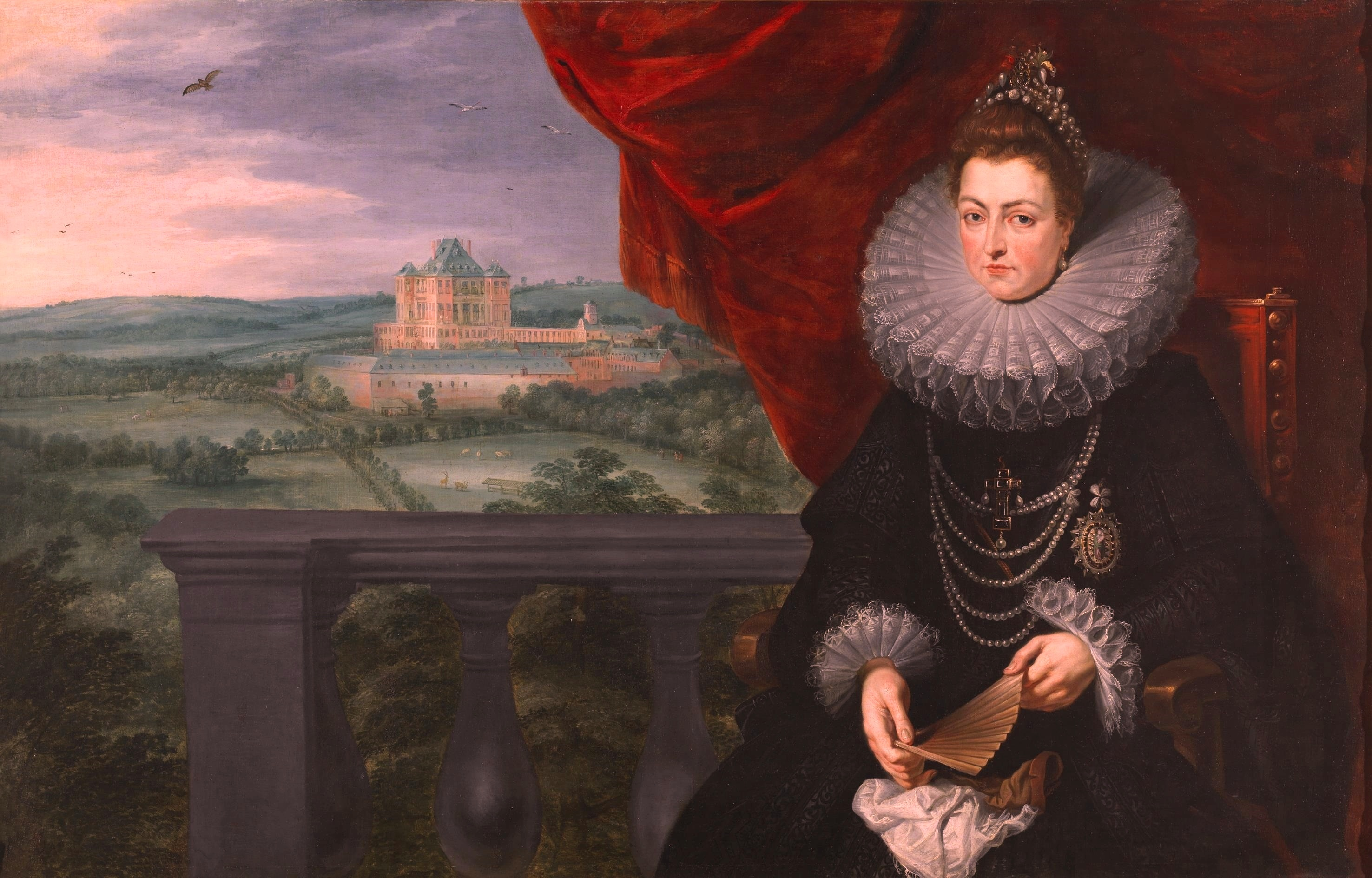
Isabel Clara Eugenia with fields and palace in the background, by Jan Brueghel and Rubens

In the foreground, there are several people raking up hay, loading it onto a cart. The painting portraits people engaged in common activities typical of the country. However, the workers in the painting are in fact members of the court. Among them, there is Isabel. The oeuvre is an allegory for the enjoyment of the life/ time spent in the country.

Isabel's love and enthusiasm for the life in the country is evinced in her correspondence with the Duke of Lerma. For example. in a letter she wrote on October 20, 1606, the archduchess says: "[A] todos nos da la vida el exercicio y el andar al campo." In another letter, dating to May 29, 1609, she writes: "[N]os hemos venido a esta casilla a gozar del campo, que esta lindísimo [...]. En fin, la vida en el campo es la mejor de todas."

The painting is considered a collaboration between Joos de Momper and Jan Brueghel the Elder. The latter reportedly painted the figures, the former the landscape. The painting was part of a group of twenty-six paintings which reached Madrid from Flanders in the early 17th century. The paintings were to decorate the Torre de la Reina in the Alcázar de Madrid. The Excursion in the countryside of Infanta Isabel Clara Eugenia is first mentioned in an inventory of the Alcázar dating to 1636.
