= List of boat lifts =

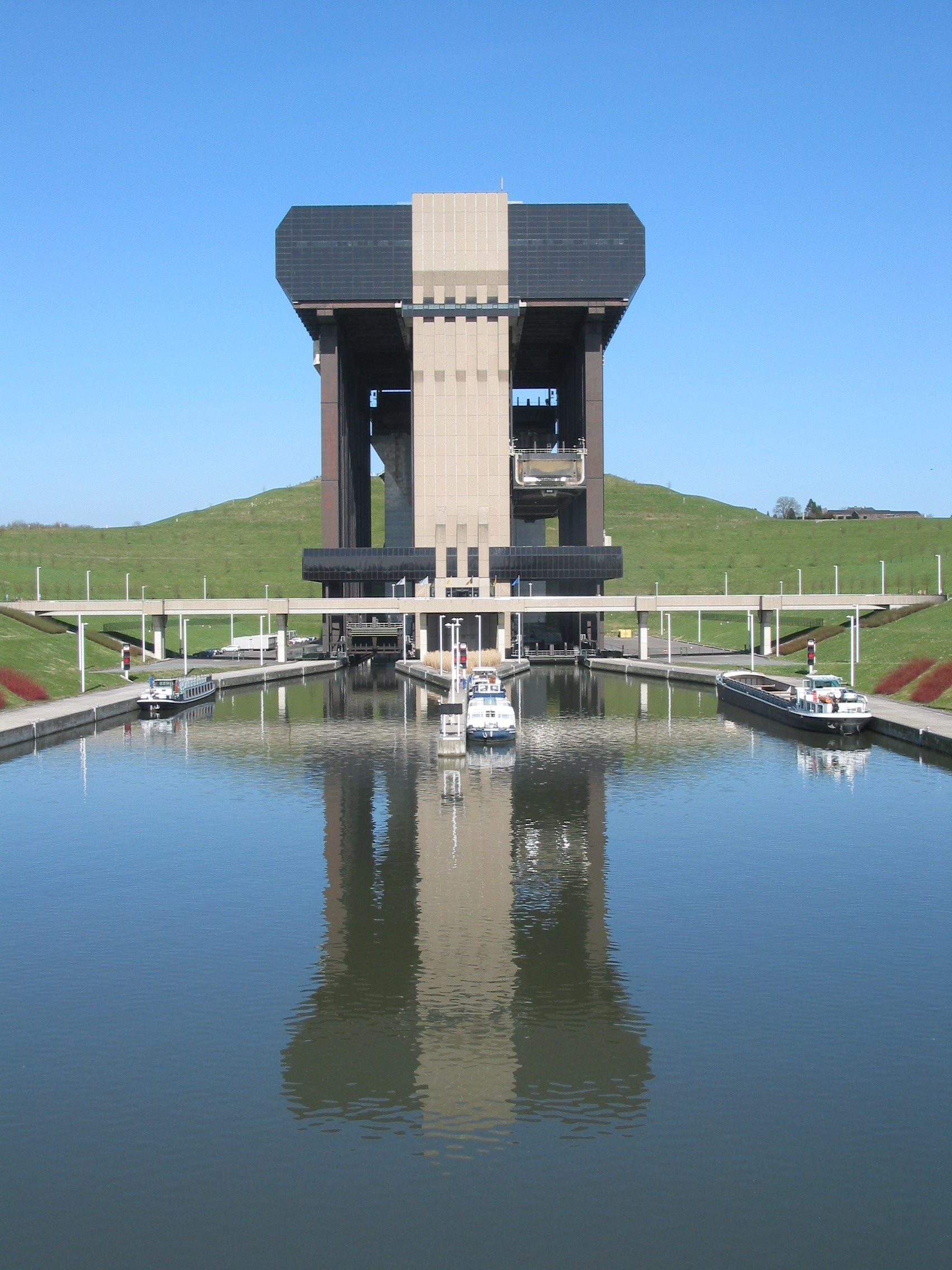
Strépy-Thieu boat lift

This list includes all types of constructions to lift or lower boats between two levels of a waterway, such as boat lifts, canal inclined planes, portage railways and water slopes, but excluding conventional locks.

== Belgium ==
- Canal du Centre lift No. 1 at Houdeng-Goegnies
- Lifts on the old Canal du Centre: No. 2 at Houdeng-Aimeries, No. 3 at Strépy-Bracquegnies, No. 4 at Thieu
- Strépy-Thieu boat lift at Thieu in the municipality of Le Rœulx
- Ronquières inclined plane at Ronquières in the municipality of Braine-le-Comte

== Canada ==
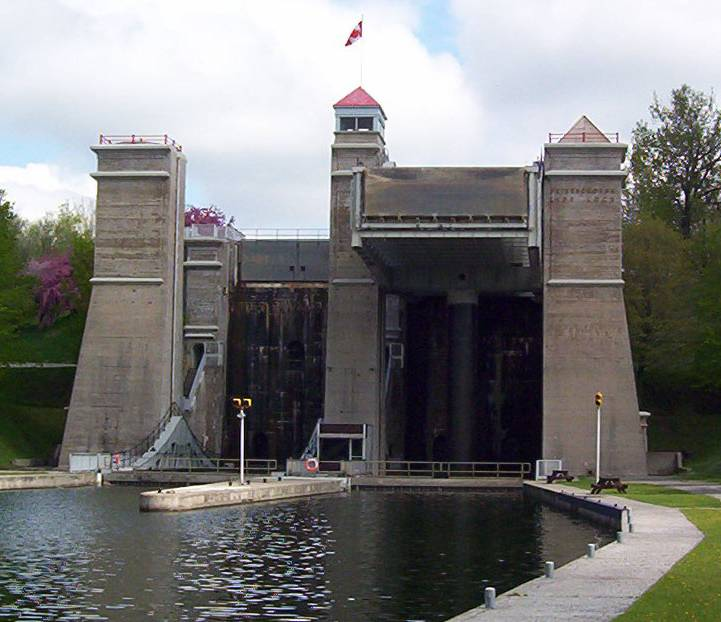
Peterborough lift lock

- Trent–Severn boat lifts
  - Kirkfield Lift Lock
  - Peterborough Lift Lock
  - Big Chute Marine Railway
  - Swift Rapids Marine Railway (replaced in 1965 with a traditional boat lock)

== China ==
- Danjiangkou dam boat lift, in Hubei Province, capable of lifting vessels of 450 tons displacement.
- Geheyan dam boat lift, also in Hubei Province, capable of lifting vessels of 300 tons displacement. The dam was completed in 1994, but technical difficulties delayed the opening of the ship lift for four more years.
- Longtan dam boat lift, capacity to lift vessels of 250 tons, in a basin 40×10.8×1.8 meters, and a vertical lift of 68.5 meters.
- Yantan Ship Lift
- Three Gorges Dam, boat lift (possibly complete July 2016) and staircase lock

== France ==
- Fontinettes boat lift
- Fonsérannes water slope (near Béziers) on the canal du Midi
- Montech water slope on the canal de Garonne
- The inclined plane of Saint-Louis-Arzviller in Lorraine on the Canal de la Marne au Rhin

== Germany ==
- Kahnhebehaus Halsbrücke, also known as Rothenfurther Kahnhebehaus (tub boat lift house)
- Kahnhebehaus Großvoigtsberg, also known as Christbescherunger Kahnhebehaus
- Henrichenburg boat lift
- Niederfinow boat lift
- Rothensee boat lift
- Scharnebeck twin ship lift

== Japan ==
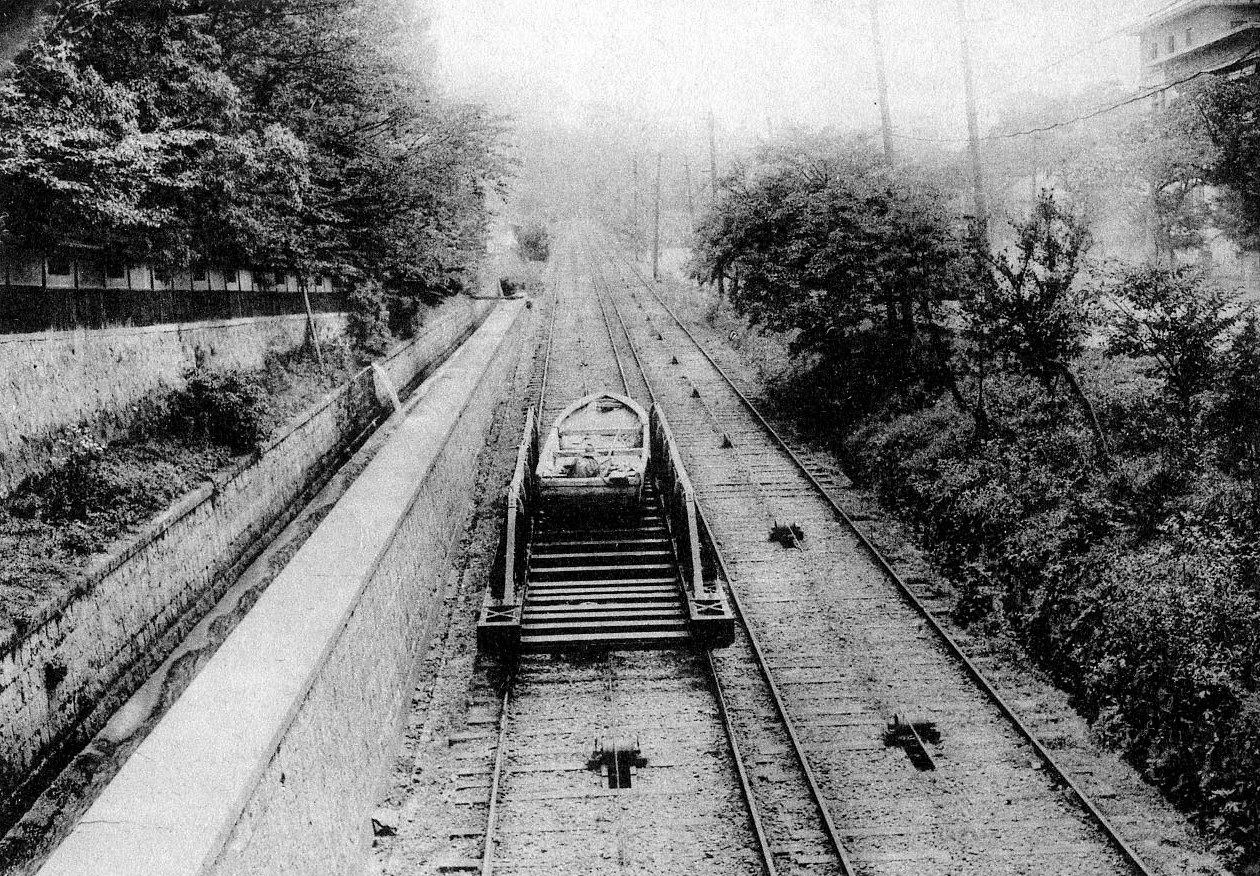
Keage Incline around 1940

- Fushimi inclined plane on Biwako canal in Fushimi-ku, Kyoto (obsolete)
- Keage inclined plane on Biwako canal in Kyōto (obsolete)

== Netherlands ==
- Overhaal boat lift in Broekerhaven, Bovenkarspel

== Poland ==
- Elbląg inclined planes on the Elbląg Canal

== Russia ==
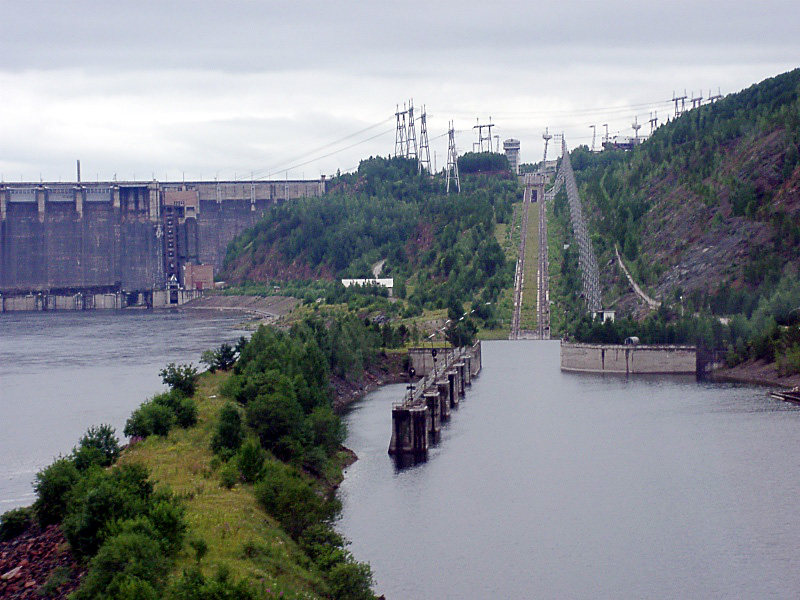
Krasnoyarsk Inclined Plane

- Krasnoyarsk inclined plane (electric rack railway) at the Krasnoyarsk hydroelectric dam

== United Kingdom ==
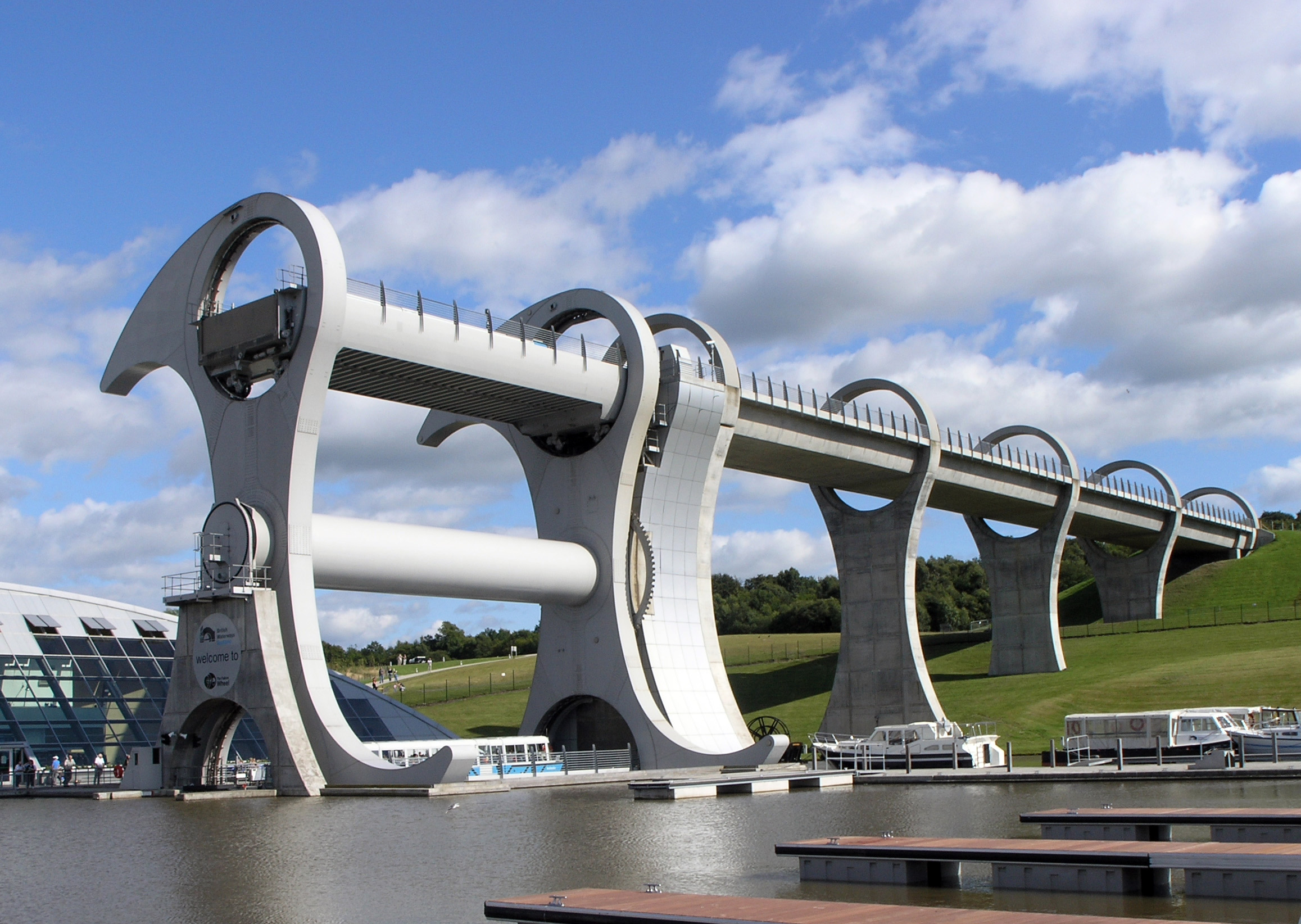
Falkirk Wheel

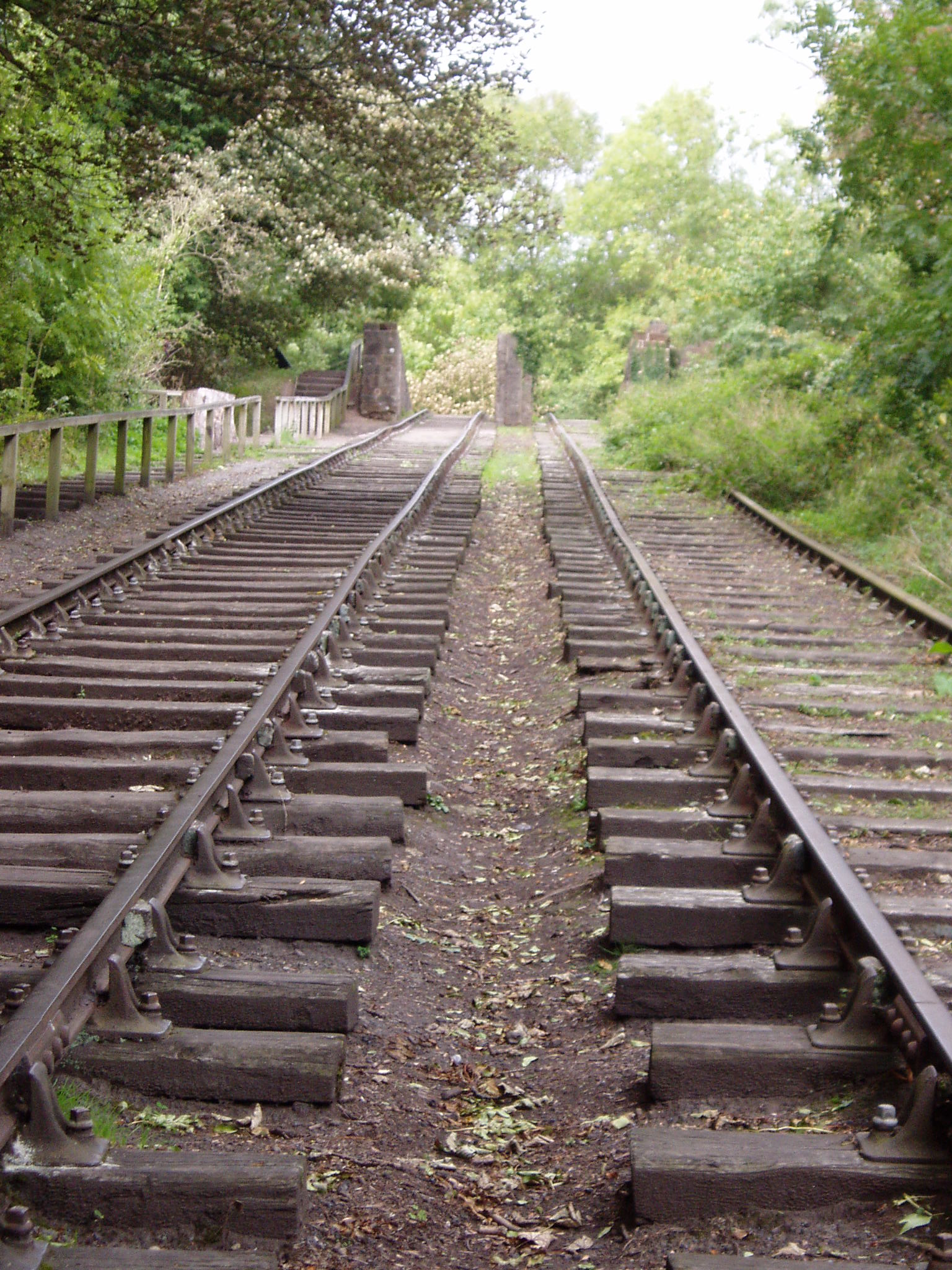
Hay Inclined Plane

- Anderton Boat Lift
- Blackhill Inclined Plane of the Monkland Canal
- Bridgetown Incline on the Bude Canal
- Brogborough Whirl proposed spiral inclined plane to navigate Brogborough Hill
- Combe Hay Caisson lock
- Camden Lock, William Congreve's hydropneumatic lock.
- The inclined planes of Dukart's Canal
- Falkirk Wheel
- Foxton Inclined Plane (dismantled 1926, now remains only)
- The boat lifts of the Grand Western Canal
- Hay Inclined Plane
- Hobbacott Incline on the Bude Canal
- Kelpie boatlift, part of the Falkirk Helix project
- The Inclined Plane of the Ketley Canal
- Marhamchurch Incline on the Bude Canal
- Merrifield Incline on the Bude Canal
- Ridd Inclined Plane on the Rolle Canal
- Tamerton Incline on the Bude Canal
- Tardebigge Boat Lift
- Vealand Incline on the Bude Canal
- Trench Inclined Plane
- Windmill Inclined Plane on the Shropshire Canal
- Worsley Navigable Levels underground incline
- Wrockwardine Wood Inclined Plane on the Shropshire Canal

== United States ==
- The 23 inclined planes of the Morris Canal in New Jersey
- The inclined plane of the South Hadley Canal, Massachusetts
- The inclined plane of the Chesapeake and Ohio Canal
- The inclined planes of the Allegheny Portage Railroad connecting branches of the Pennsylvania Canal near Altoona, Pennsylvania
- They are also entering Lake Oswego, Oregon
