= Rothensee boat lift =

Coordinates: 52°13′26″N 11°40′21″E

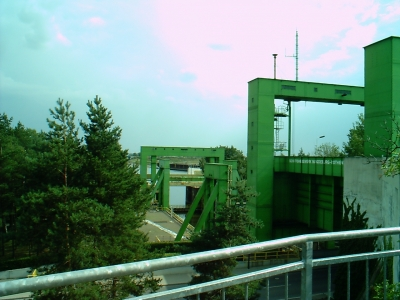
Rothensee boat lift

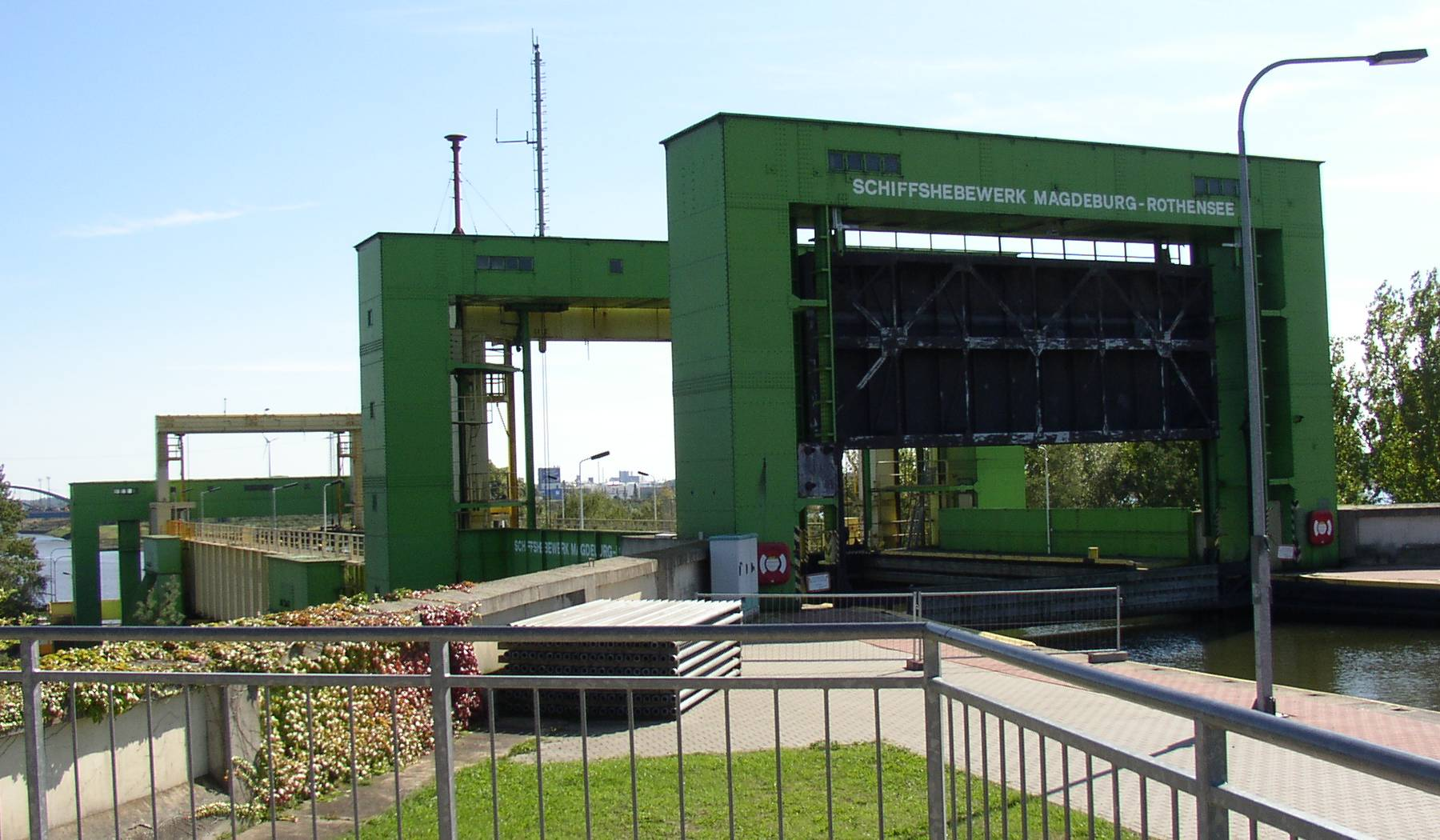
Rothensee boat lift

The Rothensee boat lift is North of Magdeburg and connects the Mittellandkanal with the Elbe via the Elbeabstiegskanal.

== Purpose ==
The Rothensee boat lift was originally envisaged as part of a larger project. The lift is at the Eastern end of the Mittellandkanal, it was intended that this canal would cross the Elbe on an aqueduct and then be connected to the Elbe-Havel Canal by a double boat lift at Hohenwarthe. The Rothensee lift is about 500m from the junction of the Elbeabstiegcanal and the MittellandKanal lowering boats to the level of the Elbe. The Rothensee lift was completed in 1938 but as a result of the Second World War the aqueduct and Hohenwarthe lift were not constructed. As part of a German re-unification transport project the Elbe aqueduct was completed after a 60-year delay; however, two shaft locks were built instead of the proposed Hohenwarthe lift. For 60 years, therefore, the Rothensee lift, which was originally intended to allow passage just from the Mittellandkanal to the Elbe carried all the navigation traffic from the West German industrial centres to West Berlin.

In 2001 the parallel Rothensee ship lock which allows the passage of bigger ships was completed making the lift redundant.

== Technology ==
The boat lift overcomes a normal water level difference of 16 metres, however, changing water levels on the Elbe causes this to vary between 11 and 18 metres. The trough moves between levels in 3 minutes. A boat can pass through the lift in 20 minutes. Approximately 70 ships with a maximum displacement of 1,000 tonnes pass through the lift daily. The dimensions of the caisson are 85 x 12.2 x 2.5 meters.

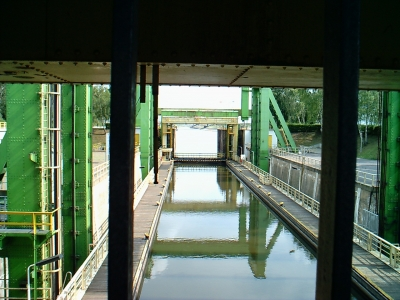
Boat lift trough

The Rothensee boat lift utilizes floats in float chambers in a similar manner to that at Henrichenburg. In this case only two float chambers were needed. The lift follows the patented plans of Rudolf Mussaeus. The trough is 85 metres long and 12.2 metres wide and is supported on two 36 metre long 10 metre in diameter cylindrical floats submerged in two 60 metre deep float chambers. The floats are internally sub-divided into three separate chambers. Each of these chambers is filled with air compressed to a pressure appropriate to its depth in the float chamber in order to prevent implosion. The floats provide buoyant lift equivalent to 5,400 tonnes, enough to balance the weight of the trough and its load of water and ship. The trough is set in motion using four worm geared shafts, 27.3 metres long and 42 centimetres in diameter moved by eight 44 kW electric motors. Because the trough and its load are in equilibrium with the floats only the friction opposing the troughs movement needs to be overcome by the motors. A complete lift can be achieved using less than 500 kW of power.

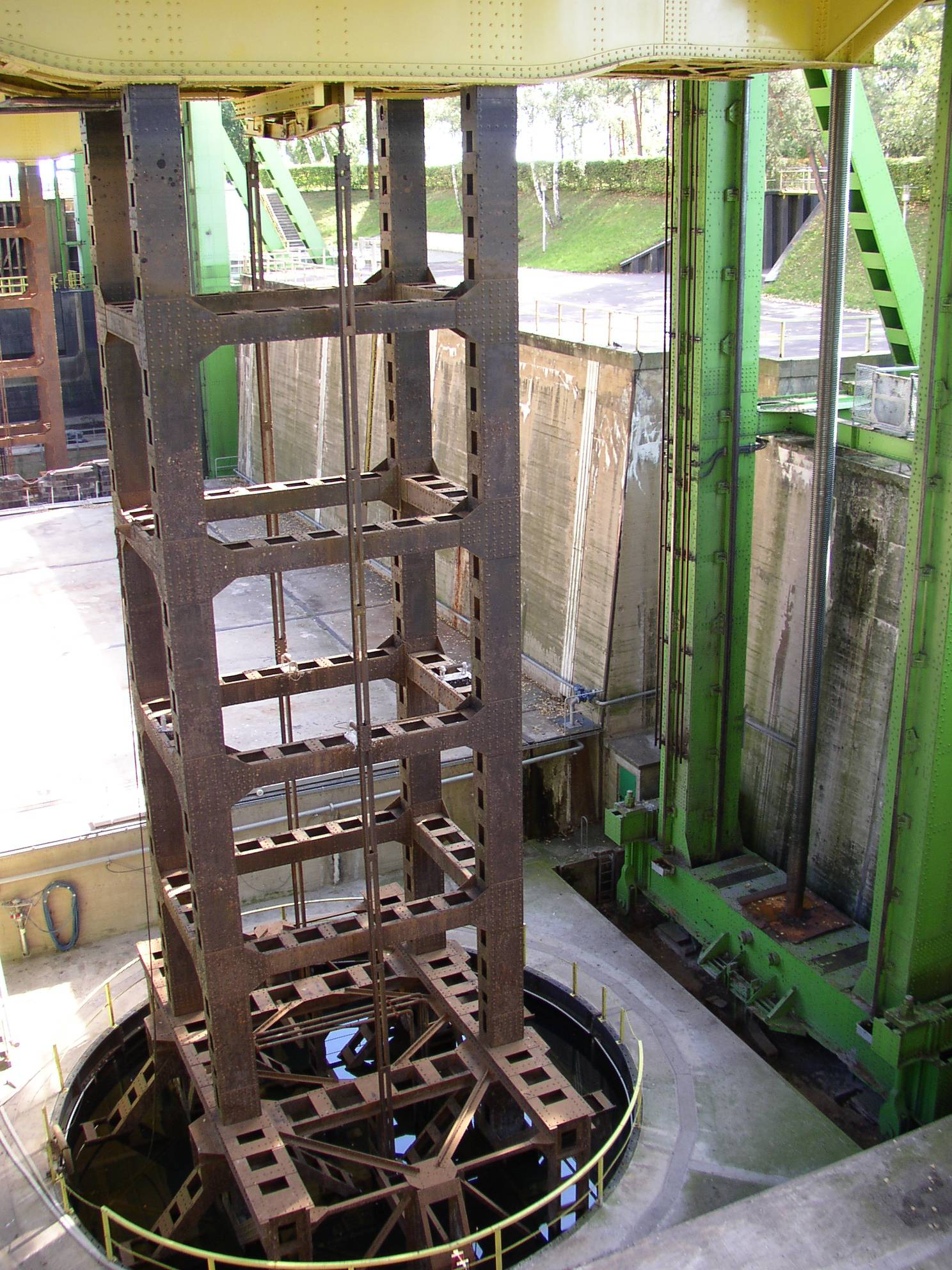
To the right of one of the geared shafts

This method of construction was selected because a standard lock was not technically possible over this height difference at the time. This method also saved the cost of back pumping lost water. Today 110 million m^{3} of water are back pumped for the parallel ship lock each year.

The overall height of the lift measured from the base of the underground float chambers to the upper cross beams is 97.21 metres. The water depth in the trough is usually 2.5 metres.

== History ==
The building of the boat lift was a major engineering achievement. To build the lift 225,000 cubic metres of earth were moved and 55,000 cubic metres of concrete were needed. In order to dig the pits for the two 60m deep float chambers the ground was frozen to a temperature of -40 degrees Celsius in order to prevent a possible collapse of the excavation. It took 4 months for the temperature to be lowered by the correct amount. In the neighbourhood of the boat lift a company owned housing estate, the Schiffshebewerk Estate was built.

In the first 50 years of its existence 730,000 lifts were completed. In the years 1980 and 1981 an 18-month-long general overhaul was completed. It was at this time that it received its green coat of paint.

== The lift today ==
Despite the completion of the parallel locks in 2001 the lift is still in use. The German Federal audit office, aware of the lift's current loss making status will probably bring about the lift's closure in the near future.

== See also ==
- Original German article from which this article was translated
- Anderton Boat Lift, Anderton, Cheshire
- Peterborough Lift Lock, Canada
- Strépy-Thieu boat lift, Belgium
- Falkirk Wheel
- Lifts on the old Canal du Centre
