= Krasnoyarsk ship lift =

Boat lift in Russia

Coordinates: 55.9388°N 92.2873°E

Krasnoyarsk ship lift Судоподъёмник Красноярской ГЭС
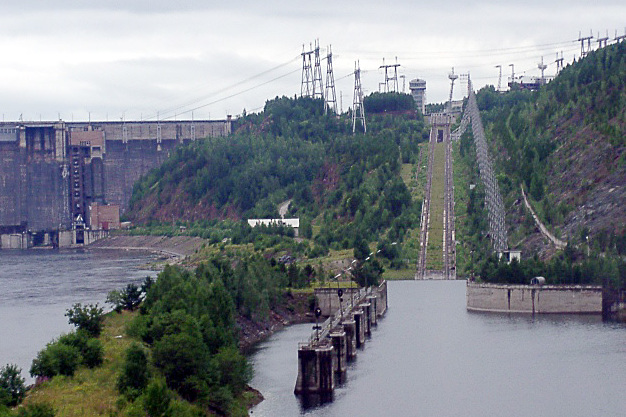

General information
- Location: Russia, Krasnoyarsk Krai, Divnogorsk
- System: Boat lift

History
- Opened: 1982
Location

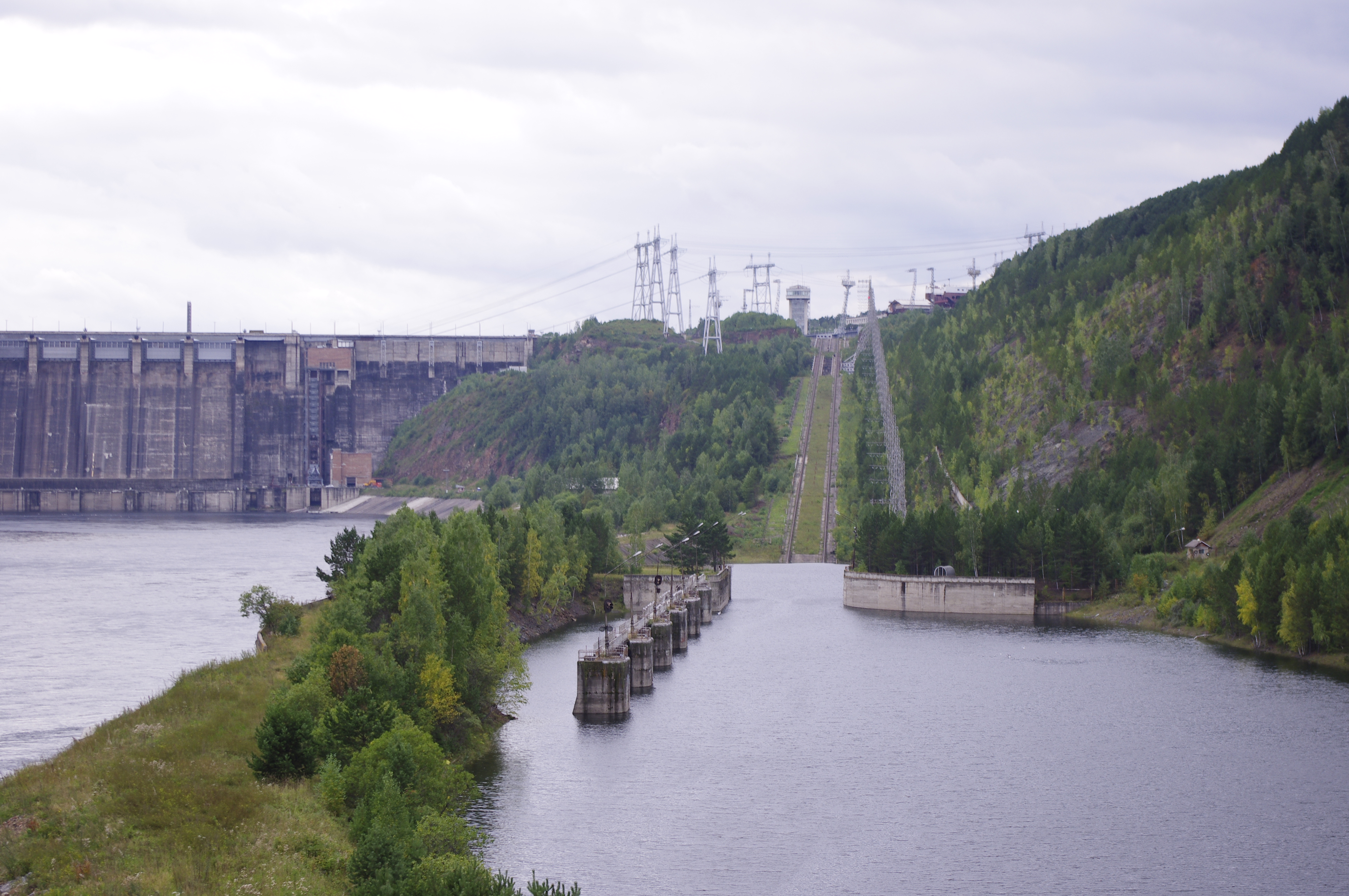
Ship lift of Krasnoyarsk hydroelectric power station

The Krasnoyarsk ship lift (Russian: Судоподъёмник Красноярской ГЭС, romanized: Sudopod'yemnik Krasnoyarskoy GES) is a boat lift at the Krasnoyarsk hydroelectric power station on the Yenisei River, located in Divnogorsk, Russia. It is the only boat lift in Russia.

The Krasnoyarsk ship lift was developed by Lenhydroproject, and manufactured by Lengidrostal. Construction began in 1976, and the lift was operational by 1982. The boat lift consists of the outer harbor, the bottom of the approach channel, the lift itself, and a turntable. The platform of the lift moves along an inclined rack railway with a track gauge of 9 m. The lift is propelled by an electric drive.

Ships transported by the Krasnoyarsk ship lift remain afloat. The lift platform contains a caisson, so that boats may simply float into the platform when they wish to traverse the dam. In order to load the ship lift, the platform is partially lowered below the water level and a gate opens. A ship may then float onto the platform, at which point the gate is closed behind the ship, sealing the ship and water onto the platform. The platform then moves up the overpass along its tracks.

At the crest of the hill the rails are built upon, the platform enters a turntable which rotates the platform onto another track heading down the opposite slope of the hill. Following this track the platform is lowered into the upper tail waters of the Krasnoyarsk dam. Once the platform is partially submerged on the other side of the dam, the gate opens again and the ship may leave the lift and enter the Krasnoyarsk Reservoir.

== Technical features ==
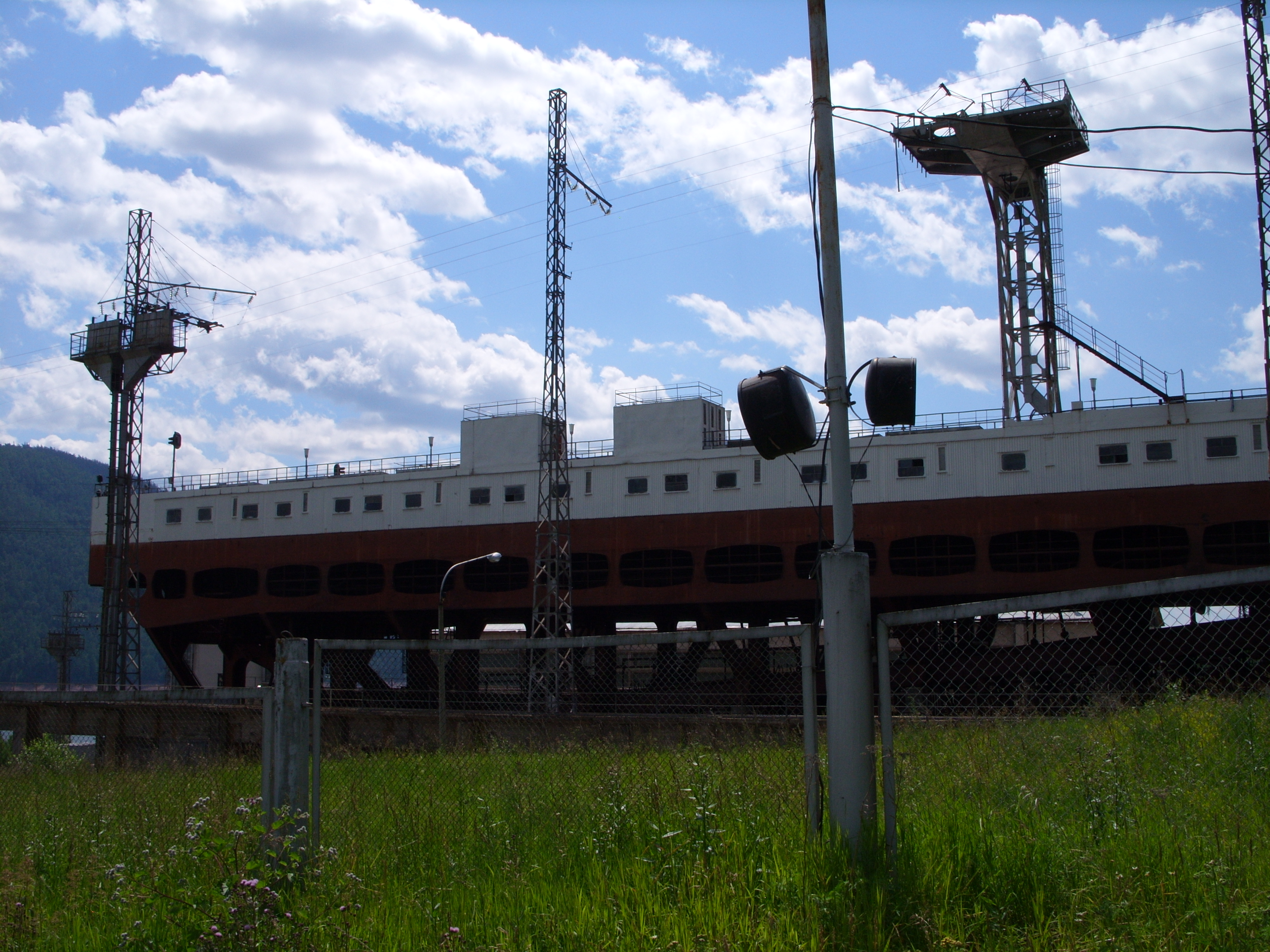
A ship being transported

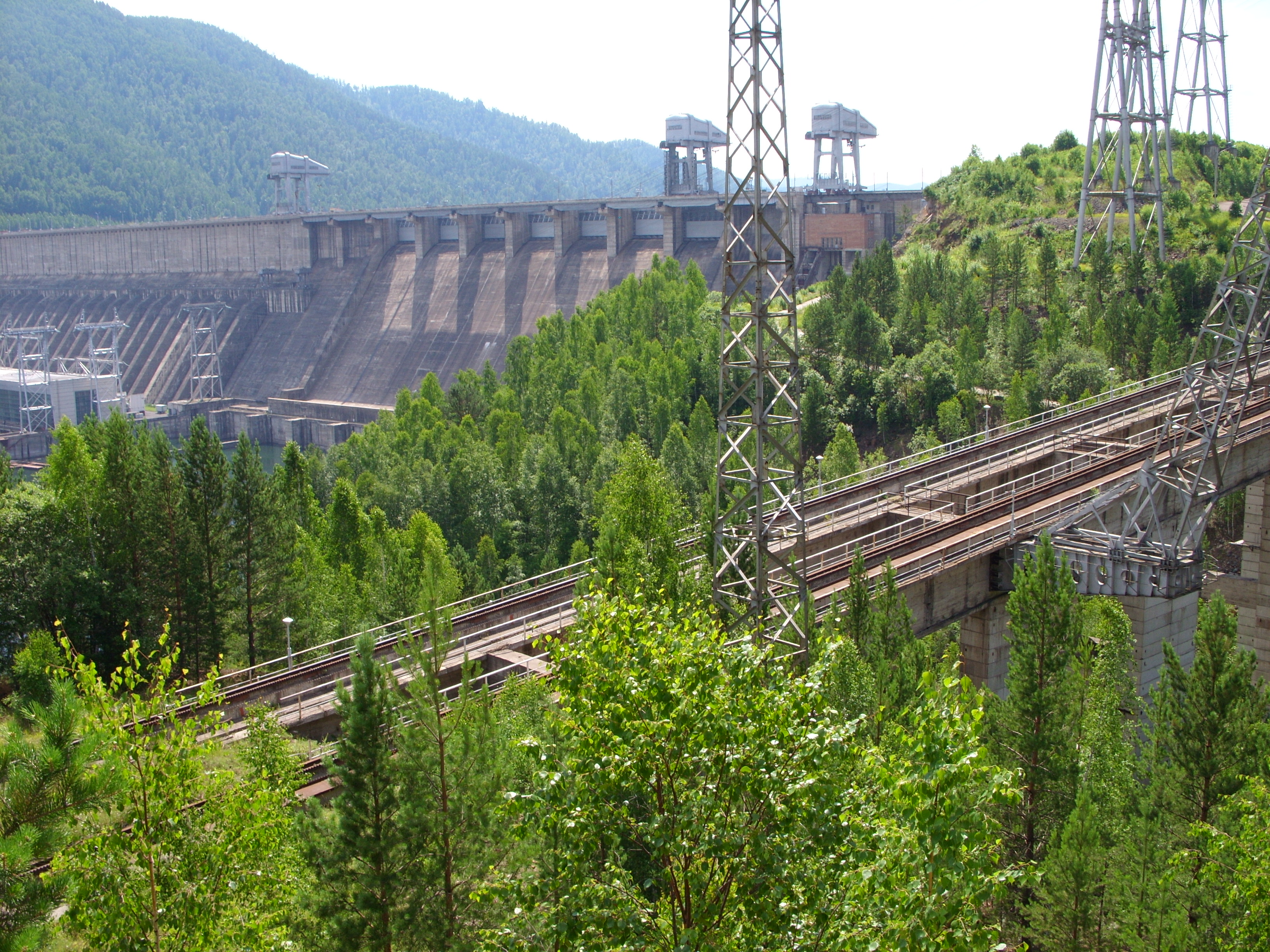
The rail track of the ship lift

External videos
- Krasnoyarsk ship lift (FBU "Administration "Yeniseirechtrans") on YouTube
- It's the one: Krasnoyarsk ship lift on YouTube

- calculated load capacity - up to 1,500 t (1,500 long tons; 1,700 short tons)
- useful dimensions of ship-chamber: length - 90 m (300 ft), width - 18 m (59 ft), depth - 2.2 m (7.2 ft)
- overall dimensions of ship-chamber: length - 113 m (371 ft), width - 26 m (85 ft), the maximum height - 20 m (66 ft)
- ship-chamber weight: without water - 4,500 t (4,400 long tons; 5,000 short tons), with the water and the vessel - 8,100 t (8,000 long tons; 8,900 short tons)
- level difference between the upper and lower tail water - 104 ft (32 m)m
- length of the "dry" way - 1,180 m (3,870 ft)
- full operational length with underwater sections - 1,510 m (4,950 ft)
- speed - 1 m/s (3.3 ft/s)
- rod - 850 t (840 long tons; 940 short tons)
- gearless drive - motors 1MR16C (68 kW (91 hp), the moment 29,000 N⋅m (21,000 lbf⋅ft), 24 rev/min)
- number of motors and the support wheels - 156
- number of carriages - 78
- limiting the size of the transported vessel - length 80 m (260 ft), width 17 m (56 ft), draft 1.86 m (6.1 ft)
- maximum axle load - 104 t (102 long tons; 115 short tons) per axle
- diameter of the rotator - 106 m (348 ft), angle of rotation - 140 degrees

== See also ==
- Boat lift
- Hydroelectric power plant
- Lock (water navigation)
- List of boat lifts
