= Strépy-Thieu boat lift =

Architectural structure, Belgium

Coordinates: 50°28′41″N 4°06′36″E

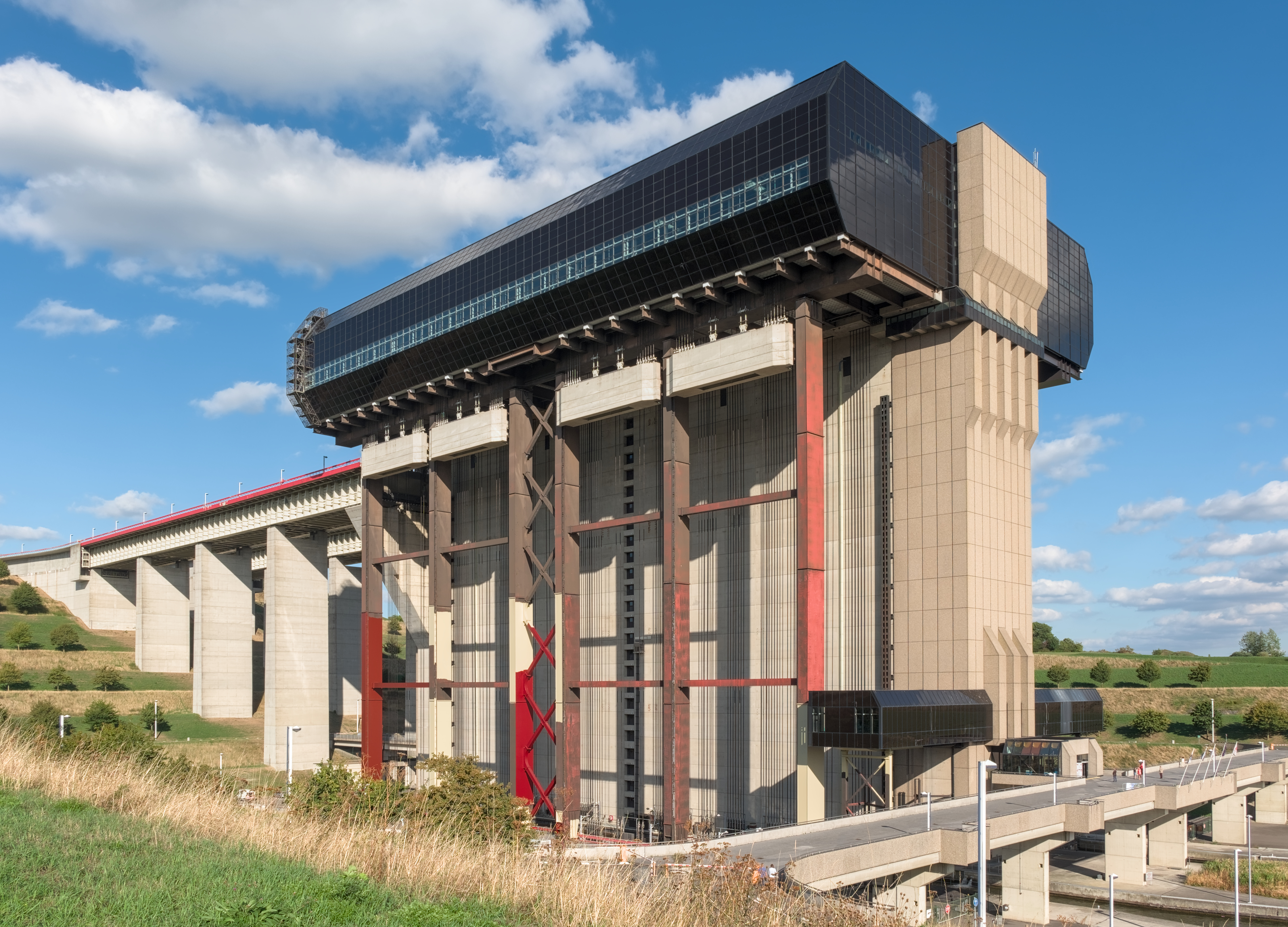
Strépy-Thieu boat lift

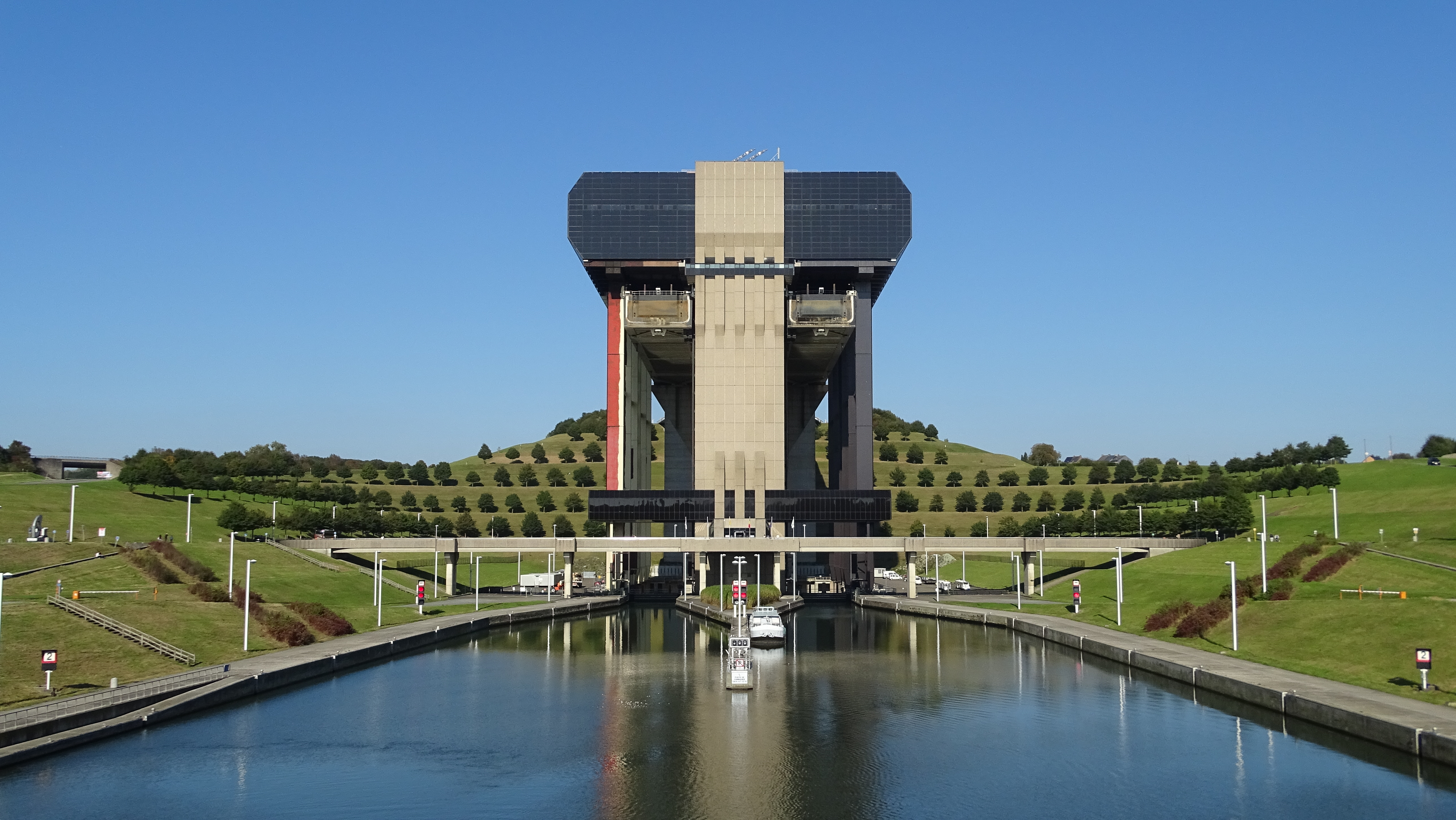
View upstream

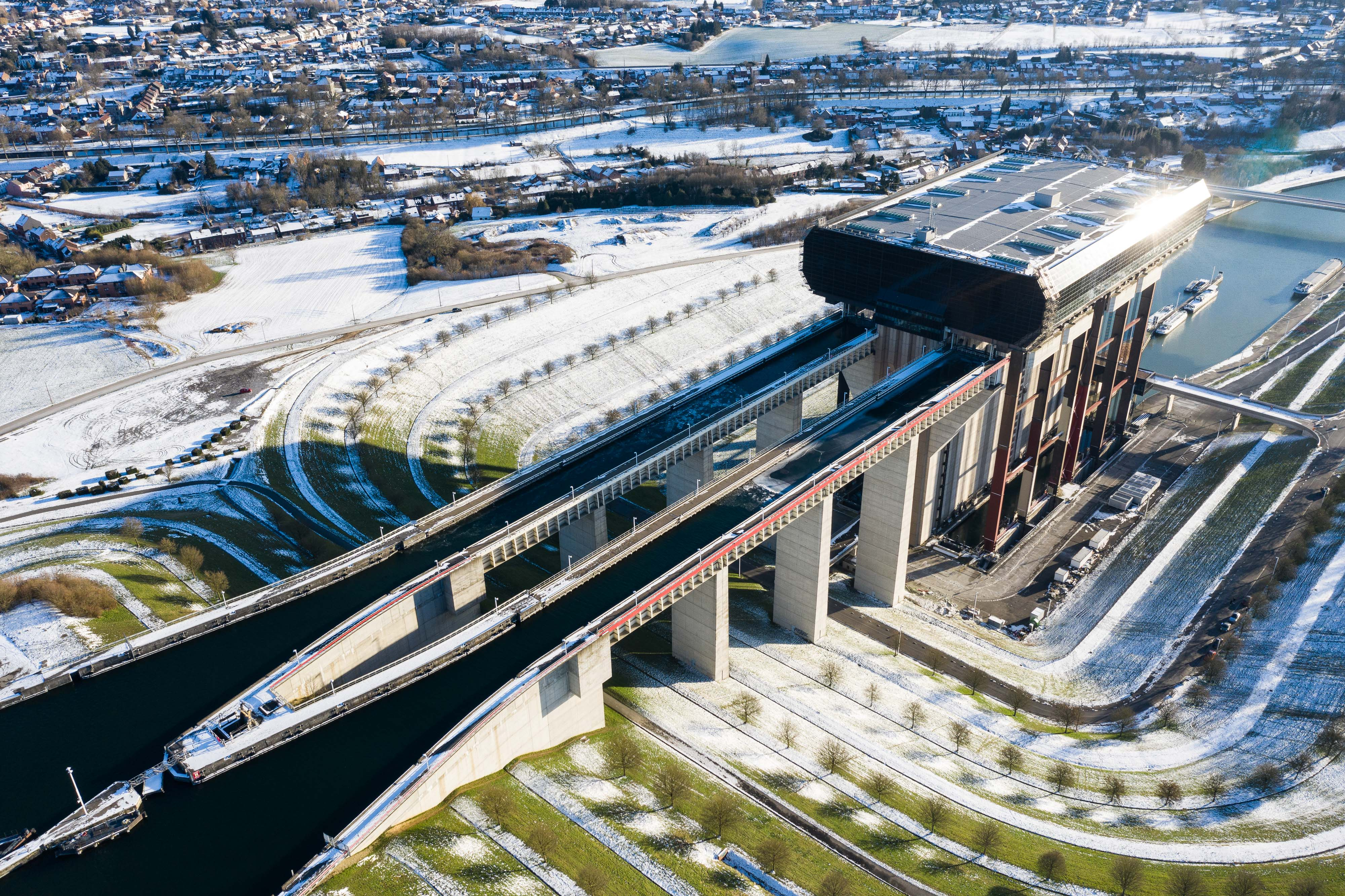
Aerial view

The Strépy-Thieu boat lift (French: L'ascenseur funiculaire de Strépy-Thieu) lies on a branch of the Canal du Centre in the municipality of Le Rœulx, Hainaut, Belgium. With a height difference of 73.15 metres (240.0 ft) between the upstream and downstream reaches, it was the tallest boat lift in the world upon its completion in 2002, and remained so until the Three Gorges Dam ship lift in China was completed in January 2016.

== History ==
The boat lift was designed during the Canal du Centre's modernisation program in order to replace a system of two locks and four 16-metre (52 ft) lifts dating from 1888 to 1919. The canal itself began operations in 1879 and its locks and lifts were able to accommodate vessels of up to 300 tonnes. By the 1960s, this was no longer adequate for the new European standard of 1350 tonnes for barge traffic, and a replacement was sought.

Construction of the lift commenced in 1982 and was not completed until 2002 at an estimated cost of €160 million (then 6.4 billion BEF), but once operational, permitted river traffic of up to the new 1350-tonne standard to pass between the waterways of the Meuse and Scheldt rivers. The lift increased river traffic from 256 kT in 2001 to 2,295 kT in 2006.

The four older lifts on the Canal du Centre, which became bypassed by the new Canal du Centre, are on the UNESCO World Heritage list, because of their architectural and historical value.

As of November 2025, the visitor center is permanently closed.

== Design ==
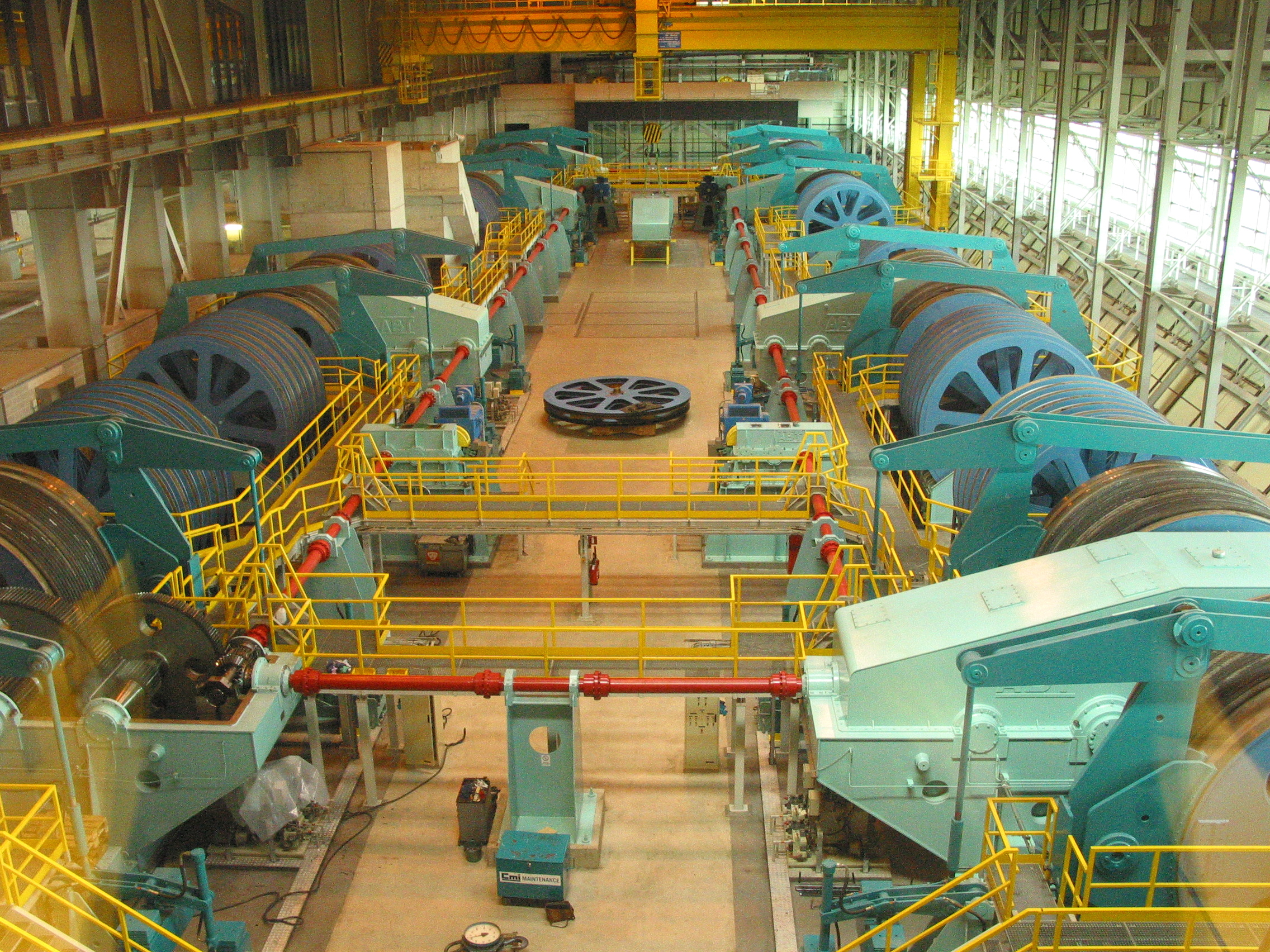
Machine hall

The structure at Strépy-Thieu consists of two independent counterweighted caissons which travel vertically between the upstream and downstream sections. Because of Archimedes' Principle, the caissons weigh the same whether they are laden with a boat or simply contain water. In practice, variations in the water level mean that the mass of each caisson varies between 7200 and 8400 tonnes. The caissons have useful dimensions of 112 m × 12 m (367 ft × 39 ft) and a water depth of between 3.35 and 4.15 m (11.0 and 13.6 ft).

Each caisson is supported by 112 suspension cables (for counterbalance) and 32 control cables (for lifting/lowering), each of 85 mm (3.3 in) diameter. The mass of the counterbalance was calculated to keep the tension in each of the control cables above 100 kN (22,000 lb_{f}) at all times. The suspension cables pass over idler pulleys with a diameter of 4.8 m (16 ft). Four electric motors power eight winches per caisson via speed-reduction gearboxes and the 73.15-metre (240.0 ft) lift is completed in seven minutes. The structure is massively reinforced to provide rigidity against torsional forces during operation and has a mass of approximately 200,000 tonnes. The vertically moving watertight gates are designed to withstand a 5 km/h (3.1 mph) impact from a 2000-tonne vessel.

The boat lift is promoted as a tourist attraction in its own right by the government of Hainaut, with a ticket for a one-way ride on the lift costing €12.

== See also ==
- List of boat lifts
- Lifts on the old Canal du Centre
- Ronquières inclined plane, 68 m (223 ft) high, Braine-le-Comte, Belgium – on the Brussels-Charleroi Canal
- Anderton boat lift
- Falkirk Wheel
- Peterborough lift lock
