= Goupitan shiplift =

Ship lift system on the Wu River, China

Coordinates: 27°22′31″N 107°37′59″E

External videos
- Video on YouTube with views of the Gupitan Dam and its boat lifts

The Goupitan shiplift (simplified Chinese: 构皮滩升船机; traditional Chinese: 構皮灘升船機; pinyin: Gòupítān Shēngchuánjī) is a boat lifting system on the Wu River, a tributary of the Yangtze River in Guizhou Province, southwest of China. A system of three boat lifts supplements the Goupitan Dam in order to provide shipping along the river.

The designed capacity of the system is 2.928 million tons of cargo per year. It allows ships with a displacement of up to 500 tons to pass, lifting them to a height of 199 m (653 ft). The construction of the boat lifting system was carried out after the completion of the power plant, it was completed in 2021, the cost of building the system was US$777.51 million. The structure of its facilities, in their order from downstream:

- Vertical boat lift with a lifting height of 72 m (236 ft), the height can change along with the water level of the downstream and can reach 79 m (259 ft);
- Concrete bridge navigable aqueduct for the passage of ships to the boat lift of the second level;
- Second vertical boat lift with a lifting height of 127 m (417 ft);
- Navigable aqueduct of the second level for the passage of ships;
- Tunnel for the passage of ships from the aqueduct of the second level towards the upstream;
- Vertical boat lift of the upstream pool, the height of the descent can change along with the water level in the reservoir and can reach 47 m (154 ft).

The total length of the two aqueducts, the navigation tunnel and the boat lifts is 2.3 km (1.4 mi). In 2023, the second boat lift with a vertical drop of 127 m (417 ft) is the tallest in the world.

== See also ==
- The Geheyan Dam with similar boat lifting system
