= Anderton Boat Lift =

Two caisson lift lock near Anderton, Cheshire, England

Coordinates: 53.2728°N 2.5305°W

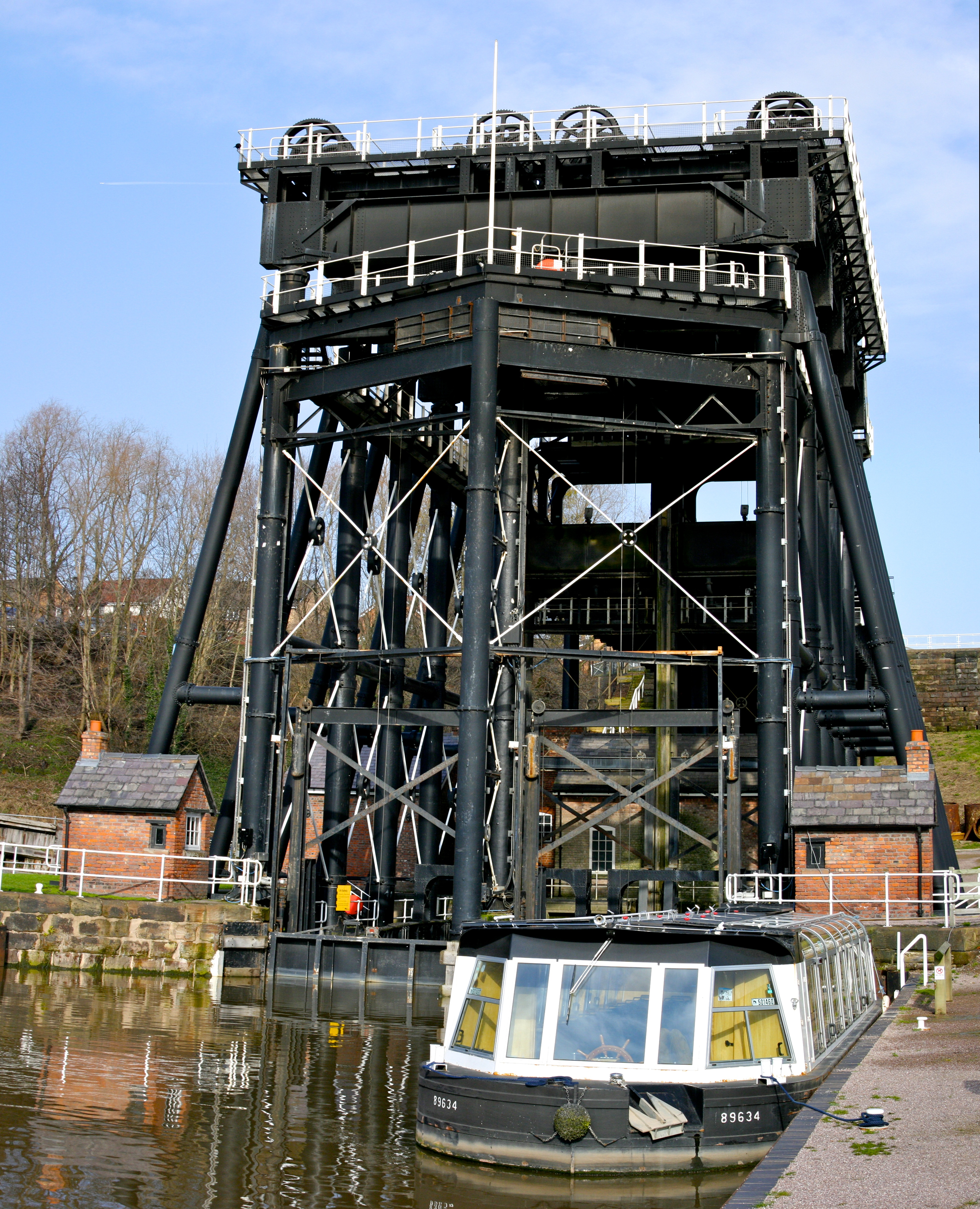
Anderton Boat Lift

The Anderton Boat Lift is a two-caisson lift lock near the village of Anderton, Cheshire, in North West England. It provides a 50-foot (15.2 m) vertical link between two navigable waterways: the River Weaver and the Trent and Mersey Canal. The structure is designated as a scheduled monument, and is included in the National Heritage List for England; it is also known as one of the Seven Wonders of the Waterways.

Built in 1875, the boat lift was in use for over 100 years until it was closed in 1983 due to corrosion. Restoration started in 2001 and the boat lift was re-opened in 2002. The lift and associated visitor centre and exhibition are operated by the Canal & River Trust. It is one of only two working boat lifts in the United Kingdom; the other is the Falkirk Wheel in Scotland.

The lift has been closed to boat traffic since 3 January 2025 following failure of a gate lift cable during routine testing. The lift will remain closed during 2026.

== Economic background ==
Aerial view of Anderton Boat Lift and basin on the north bank of the River Weaver

Salt has been extracted from rock salt beds underneath the Cheshire Plain since Roman times. By the end of the 17th century a major salt mining industry had developed around the Cheshire "salt towns" of Northwich, Middlewich, Nantwich and Winsford.

Completion of the River Weaver Navigation in 1734 provided a navigable route for transporting salt from Winsford, through Northwich, to Frodsham, where the Weaver joins the River Mersey. The River Weaver Navigation Act 1759 (33 Geo. 2. c. 49) appointed the Trustees of the Weaver Navigation and gave them responsibility for maintaining and operating the route. The opening of the Trent and Mersey Canal in 1777 provided a second route close to the Weaver Navigation for part of its length, but extended further south to the coal mining and pottery industries around Stoke-on-Trent.

Rather than competing with each other the owners of the two waterways decided it would be more profitable to work together. In 1793 a basin was excavated on the north bank of the Weaver at Anderton that took the river to the foot of the escarpment of the canal – 50 ft (15.2 m) above. The Anderton Basin was owned and operated by the Weaver Navigation Trustees. Facilities were built to trans-ship goods between the waterways including two cranes, two salt chutes and an inclined plane that was possibly inspired by the much larger Hay Inclined Plane at Coalport. The facilities were extended when a second quay was built in 1801 and a second entrance to the basin was constructed in 1831.

== Planning and design ==
By 1870 the Anderton Basin was a major interchange for trans-shipping goods in both directions, with extensive warehousing, three double inclined planes and four salt chutes. Trans-shipment was time-consuming and expensive, and the Trustees of the Weaver Navigation decided a link between the waterways was needed to allow boats to pass directly from one to the other. A flight of locks was considered but discarded, mainly because of the lack of a suitable site and the loss of water that would have resulted from using them. In 1870 the Trustees proposed a boat lift between the waterways at the Anderton Basin. The Trustees approached the North Staffordshire Railway Company, owners of the Trent and Mersey Canal, to ask for a contribution towards the cost. When this approach was unsuccessful the Trustees decided to fund the project themselves.

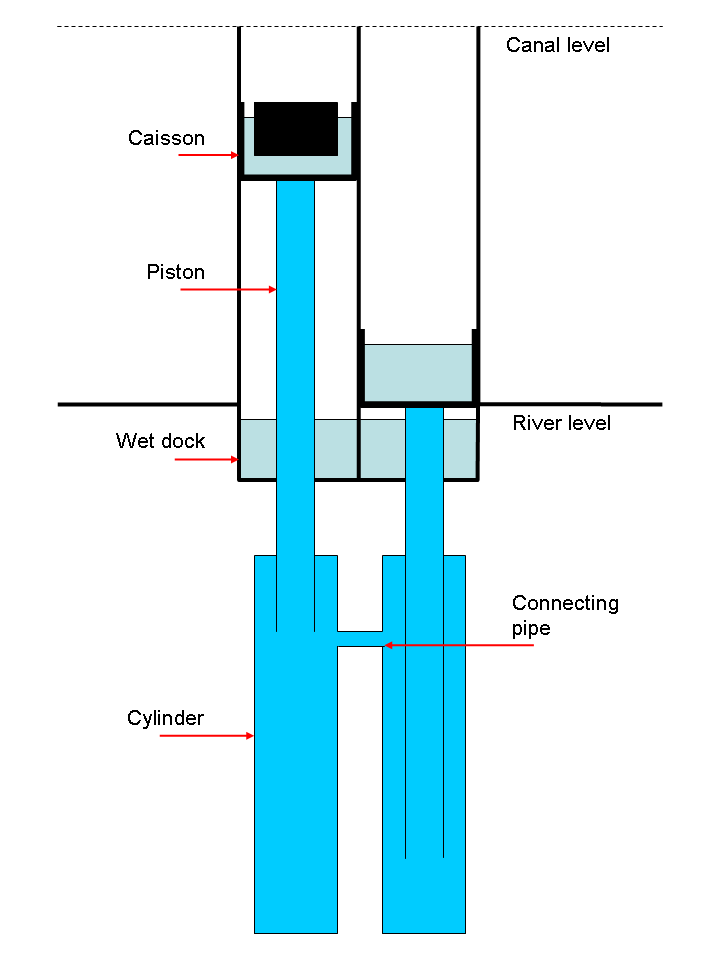
Anderton Boat Lift – diagram of original hydraulic configuration (not to scale)

The Trustees asked their Chief Engineer, Edward Leader Williams, to draw up plans for a boat lift. He settled on a design involving a pair of water-filled caissons that would counterbalance one another and require relatively little power to lift boats up and down. A similar boat lift on the Grand Western Canal, completed in 1835, used chains to connect the caissons via an overhead balance wheel. It had a solid masonry superstructure to support the weight of the loaded caissons. Leader Williams realised that if he used water-filled hydraulic rams to support the caissons their weight would be borne by the rams and their cylinders, buried underground and a much lighter superstructure could be used. He may have been inspired by inspecting a hydraulic ship lift and graving dock at the Royal Victoria Dock in London, designed by experienced hydraulic engineer Edwin Clark.

Having decided on a hydraulic ram design Leader Williams appointed Edwin Clark as principal designer. At that time the Anderton Basin consisted of a cut on the north bank of the Weaver surrounding a small central island. Clark decided to build the boat lift on this island. The wrought iron caissons were 75 ft (22.9 m) long by 15 ft 6 in (4.72 m) wide by 9 ft 6 in (2.90 m) deep, and could each accommodate two 72 ft (21.9 m) narrowboats or a barge with a beam of up to 13 feet (4.0 m). Each caisson weighed 90 long tons (91 tonnes; 100 short tons) when empty and 252 long tons (256 t; 282 short tons) when full of water (because of displacement, the weight is the same with or without boats). Each caisson was supported by a single hydraulic ram consisting of a hollow 50 ft (15.2 m) long cast iron vertical piston with a diameter of 3 ft (0.9 m), in a buried 50 ft (15.2 m) long cast iron vertical cylinder with a diameter of 5 feet 6 inches (1.68 m). At river level the caissons sat in a water-filled sandstone lined chamber. Above ground the superstructure consisted of seven hollow cast iron columns which provided guide rails for the caissons and supported an upper working platform, walkways and access staircase. At the upper level the boat lift was connected to the Trent and Mersey canal via a 165 ft (50.3 m) long wrought iron aqueduct, with vertical wrought iron gates at either end.

In normal operation the cylinders of the hydraulic rams were connected by a 5 in (130 mm) diameter pipe that allowed water to pass between them, thus lowering the heavier caisson and raising the lighter one. To make adjustments at the start and end of a lift either cylinder could be operated independently, powered by an accumulator or pressure vessel at the top of the lift structure, which was kept primed by a 10 horsepower (7.5 kW) steam engine. If necessary, the steam engine and accumulator could operate either hydraulic ram independently to raise the caissons, although in this mode it took about 30 minutes to raise a caisson, as opposed to three minutes in normal operation.

== Construction ==
In October 1871 the Weaver Navigation Trustees held a special general meeting which resolved "to consider the desirability of constructing a lift with basins and all other requisite works for the interchange of traffic between the River Weaver and the North Staffordshire Canal at Anderton and of applying to Parliament for an Act to authorise the construction of such works."

Weaver Navigation Act 1872
- Act of Parliament
- Parliament of the United Kingdom
- Long title: An Act to enable the Trustees of the River Weaver Navigation to make a Communication at Anderton between their Navigation and the Trent and Mersey Canal, and for other purposes with respect to the same Trust.
- Citation: 35 & 36 Vict. c. xcviii

Dates
- Royal assent: 18 July 1872

In July 1872 royal assent was granted for the Weaver Navigation Act 1872 (35 & 36 Vict. c. xcviii), which authorised the construction of the boat lift. The contract for its construction was awarded to Emmerson, Murgatroyd & Co. of Stockport and Liverpool. Work started before the end of 1872 and took 30 months. The Anderton Boat Lift was formally opened to traffic on 26 July 1875. The total cost was £48,428 (£4,831,000 at today's prices).

== Problems of hydraulic operation ==
For five years the boat lift operated successfully, the longest closures being during spells of cold weather when the canal froze over. In 1882 a cast iron hydraulic cylinder burst while the caisson it supported was at canal level with a boat in it. The caisson descended rapidly, but water escaping from the burst cylinder slowed the rate of descent and the water-filled dock at river level softened the impact. No-one was hurt and there was no damage to the lift's superstructure. As a precaution, tests were carried out on the second hydraulic cylinder. During these tests the second cylinder failed too. As a result, the boat lift was closed for six months while sections of both cylinders were replaced and the connecting pipework, which was thought to have contributed to their failure, was redesigned.

The volume of traffic through the lift grew steadily through the 1880s and 90s but the hydraulic cylinders continued to cause problems. The gland of one cylinder (where the piston travelled through the cylinder wall) was temporarily repaired in 1887 and replaced in 1891, and the gland of the other cylinder was replaced in 1894. The main cause for concern was corrosion of the pistons. The use of canal water as a working fluid in the hydraulic system and the immersion of the pistons in the wet dock at river level led to corrosion and "grooving" of the pistons. Attempts to repair the grooves with copper made matters worse as it reacted electrolytically with the acidic canal water and hastened corrosion of the surrounding iron. In 1897 the lift was converted to use distilled water as its working fluid, slowing corrosion, but not stopping it completely. Over the next few years maintenance and repairs took place with increasing frequency, requiring complete closure of the lift for several weeks or a period of reduced and slower operation with a single caisson.

== Conversion to electrical operation ==
By 1904 the Weaver Navigation Trustees faced the prospect of closing the boat lift for a considerable period to repair the hydraulic rams. They asked their Chief Engineer Colonel J. A. Saner, to investigate alternatives to hydraulic operation. Saner proposed electric motors and a system of counterweights and overhead pulleys that would allow the caissons to operate independently of each other. Although this solution involved many more moving parts than the hydraulic system these would be above ground and accessible thus making maintenance easier and cheaper and have a longer working life. Other advantages of the conversion listed by Saner included a reduction in the number of operating attendants by one and the avoidance of costly boiler repairs. Saner promised to achieve the conversion with only three short periods of closure to traffic. This was important because it minimised disruption to traffic and the loss of revenue during conversion.

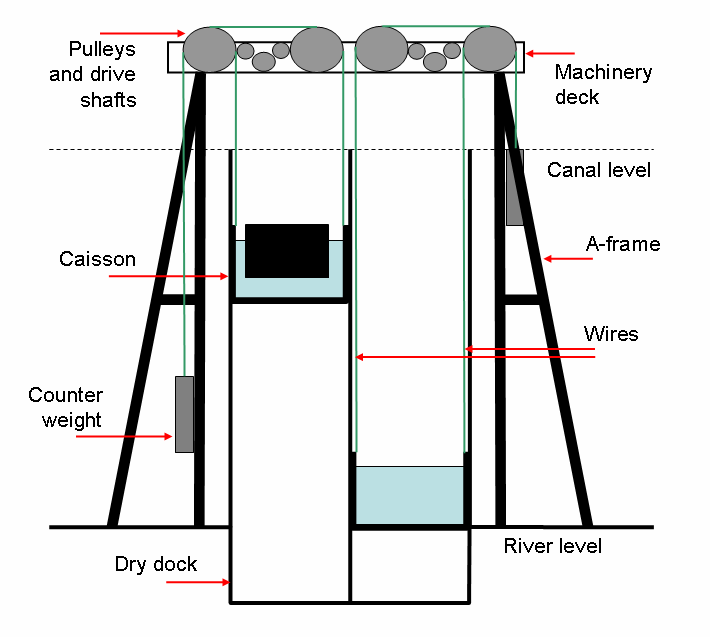
Anderton Boat Lift – diagram after conversion to electrical operation (not to scale). Note that caissons can be operated independently.

As a result, the weight of the caissons and counterweights would now be borne by the lift superstructure instead of by the rams. The superstructure was therefore strengthened and put on stronger foundations. The new superstructure was built around the original lift frame in order to avoid the need to dismantle the original lift, which would have taken it out of service for a long period. The new superstructure consisted of ten steel A-frames, five on each side, supporting a machinery deck 60 ft (18 m) above the river level where the electric motors, drive shafts and cast-iron headgear pulleys were mounted. Wire ropes attached to both sides of each caisson passed over the pulleys to 36 cast iron counterweights weighing 14 long tons (14 t; 16 short tons) each, 18 on each side to balance the 252 long tons (256 t; 282 short tons) weight of each loaded caisson. The electric motor had to overcome friction between the pulleys and their bearings. A 30 horsepower (22 kW) motor was installed, but normal operation only required about half of this power.

In addition to the new foundations and superstructure, the wet dock at river level was also converted into a dry dock and the aqueduct between the lift and the canal was strengthened. The original caissons were retained but were modified to take the wire ropes that now supported them on each side.

Conversion was carried out between 1906 and 1908. As Saner had promised, the lift was only closed for three periods during these two years, for a total of 49 days. The converted lift was formally opened on 29 July 1908 (although one caisson had been carrying traffic on electrical power since May 1908 while the second caisson was converted).

== Operation after conversion ==
After conversion to electrical operation the boat lift was operated successfully for 75 years. Regular maintenance was still necessary; for example, the wire ropes supporting the caissons suffered from fatigue from the repeated bending and straightening as they ran over the overhead pulleys and had to be replaced frequently. However, maintenance was simpler than before the conversion because the mechanism of the electrical lift was above ground. Maintenance was also less expensive because the caissons were now designed to be run independently, allowing most maintenance to be carried out while one caisson remained operational and thus avoiding the need to close the lift entirely.

During 1941 and 1942 the hydraulic rams of the original lift, which had been left in place in a shaft beneath the dry dock, were removed to salvage the iron. During the 1950s and 1960s commercial traffic on British canals declined. By the 1970s the lift's traffic was almost entirely recreational and the lift was hardly used during winter months.

The new superstructure was susceptible to corrosion and the entire lift was painted with a protective solution of tar and rubber that had to be renewed every eight years or so. In 1983, during repainting, extensive corrosion was found in the superstructure and it was declared structurally unsound and closed.

== Restoration ==
During the 1990s British Waterways carried out preliminary investigations before launching a restoration bid. It was originally intended to restore the lift to electrical operation but after consultation with English Heritage, in 1997 it was decided to restore the lift to hydraulic operation using hydraulic oil.

To raise the £7 million restoration cost, a partnership was forged between the Waterways Trust, the Inland Waterways Association, the Anderton Boat Lift Trust, the Friends of Anderton Boat Lift, the Association of Waterways Cruising Clubs, British Waterways and the Trent and Mersey Canal Society. Heritage Lottery Funding contributed £3.3 million, and more than 2,000 individuals contributed to the scheme, raising a further £430,000.

Restoration commenced in 2000 and the lift was re-opened to boat traffic in March 2002. The site now includes a two-storey visitor centre and exhibition building with a coffee shop and information and films about the history of the lift. The visitor centre incorporates the new lift control centre. Although a modified version of the original hydraulic system was reinstated, the 1906–08 external frame and pulleys have been retained in a non-operational role. The weights that used to counterbalance the caissons were not rehung, but have been used to build a maze in the grounds of the visitor centre.

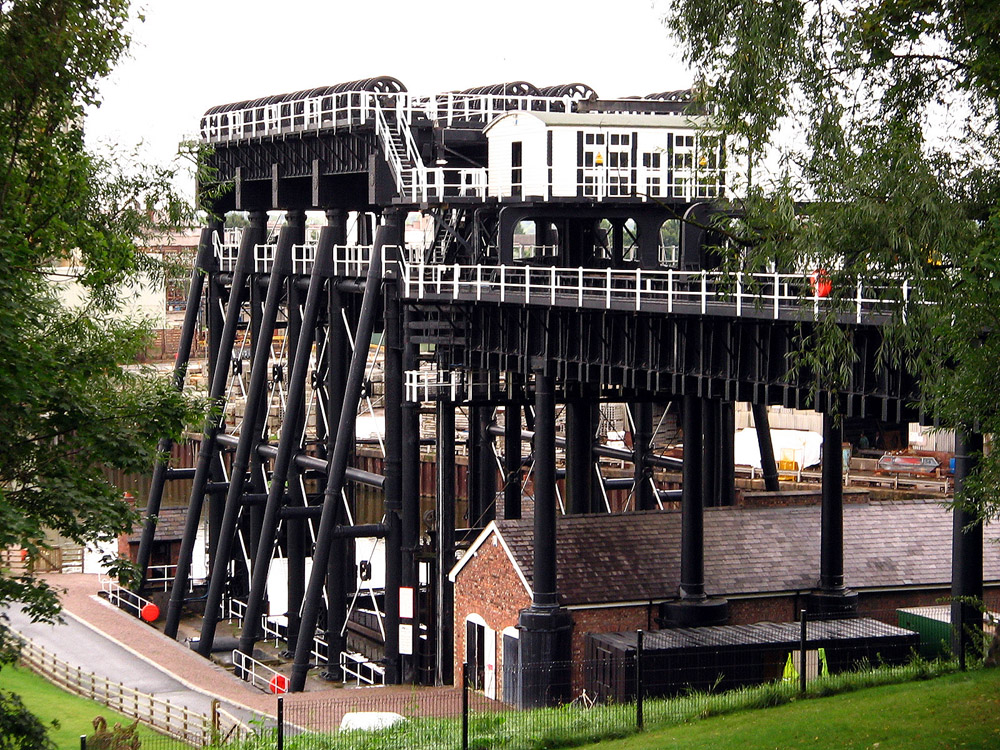
View of the restored boat lift from canal level

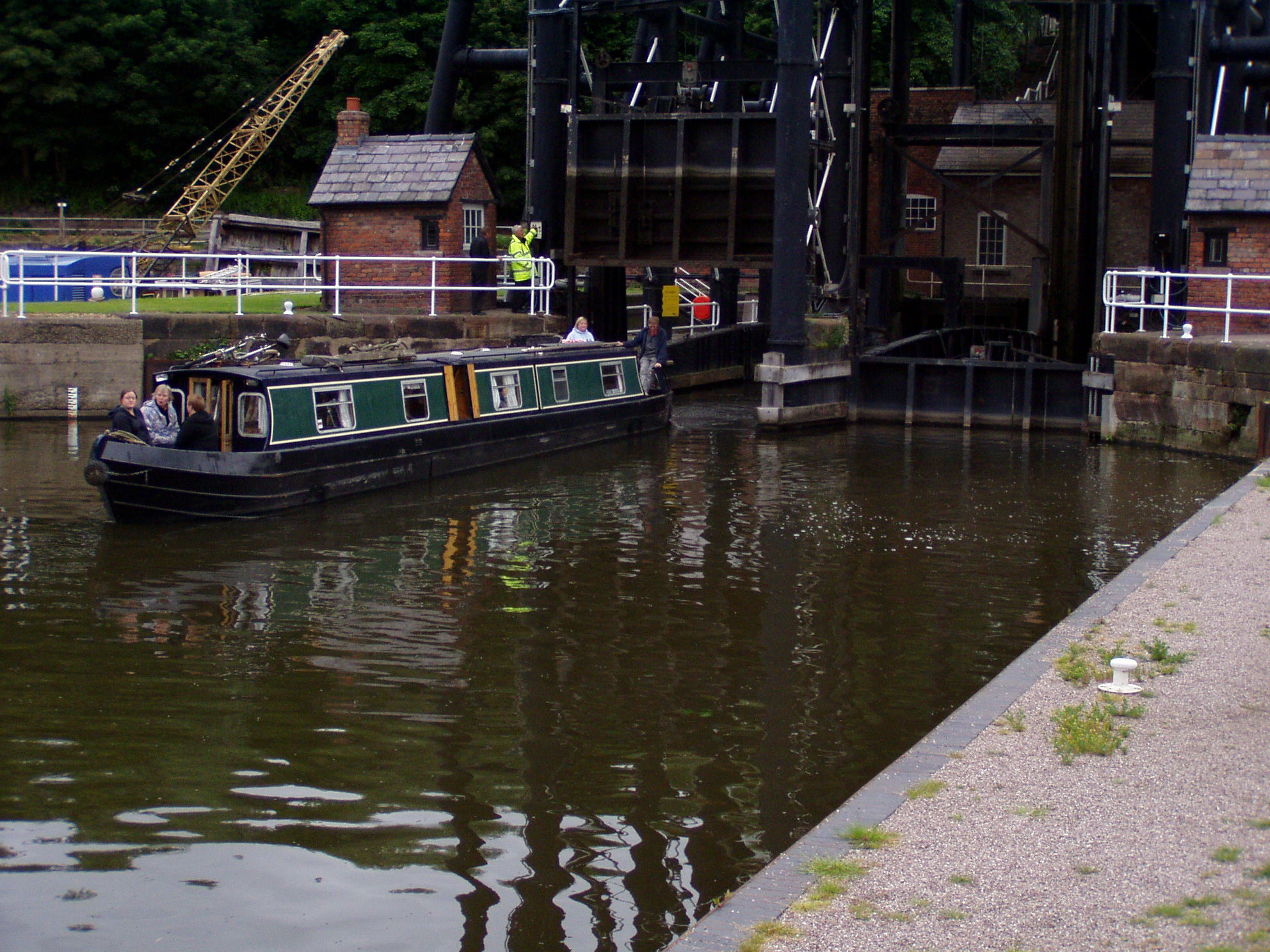
Canal boat entering the River Weaver from the base of the boat lift

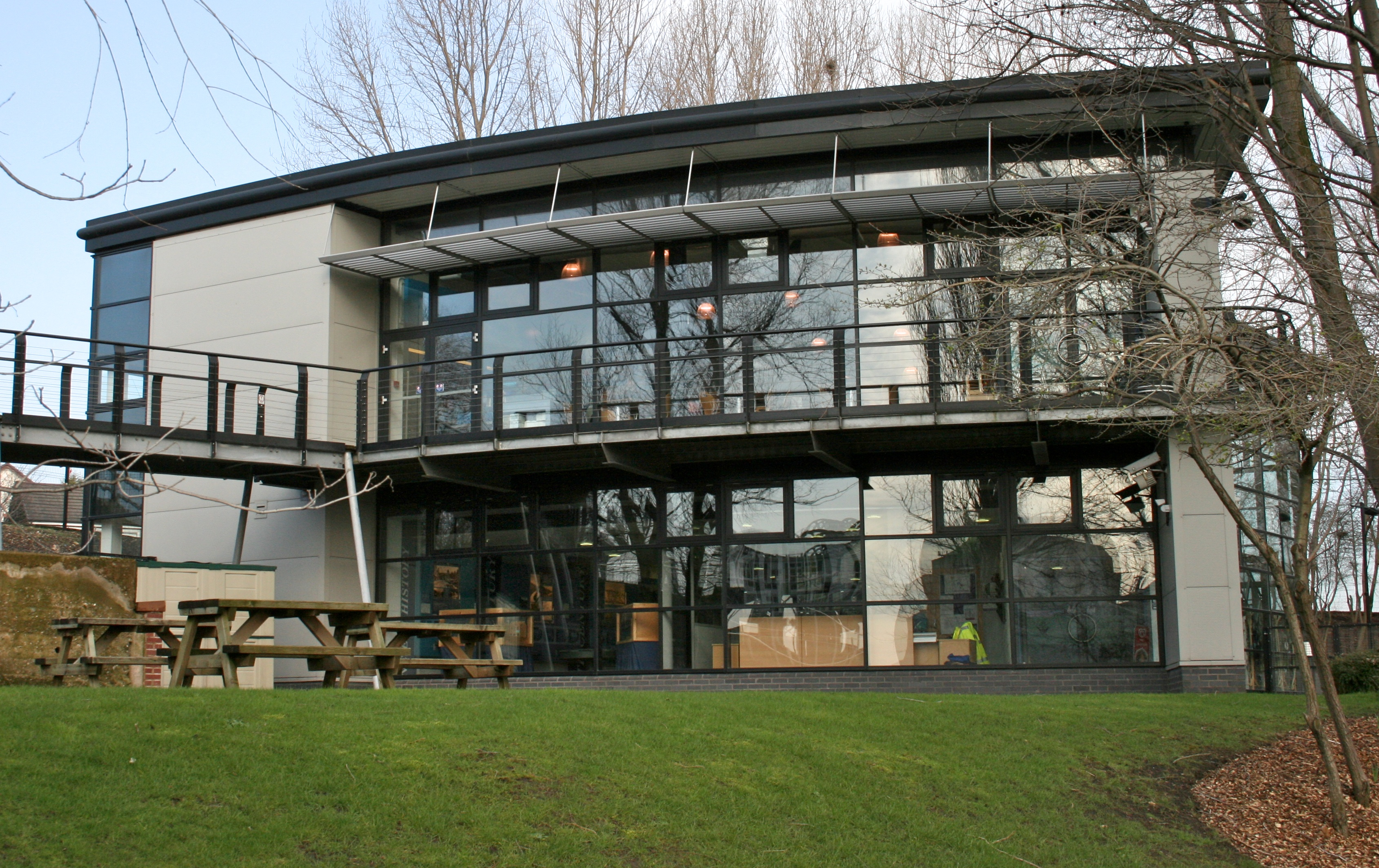
Modern Anderton Boat Lift visitor centre and exhibition building

== See also ==
- List of Scheduled Monuments in Cheshire (post-1539)
- List of waterway societies in the United Kingdom
- Strépy-Thieu boat lift – the world's second-tallest boat lift, in Le Rœulx, province of Hainaut, Belgium
- Falkirk Wheel
- Peterborough lift lock – the world's tallest hydraulic boat lift, in Peterborough, Ontario, Canada
- Foxton Inclined Plane – former inclined plane on the Grand Union Canal
- Canals of the United Kingdom
- Canals in Cheshire
