= Tub boat lift =

Type of boat lift

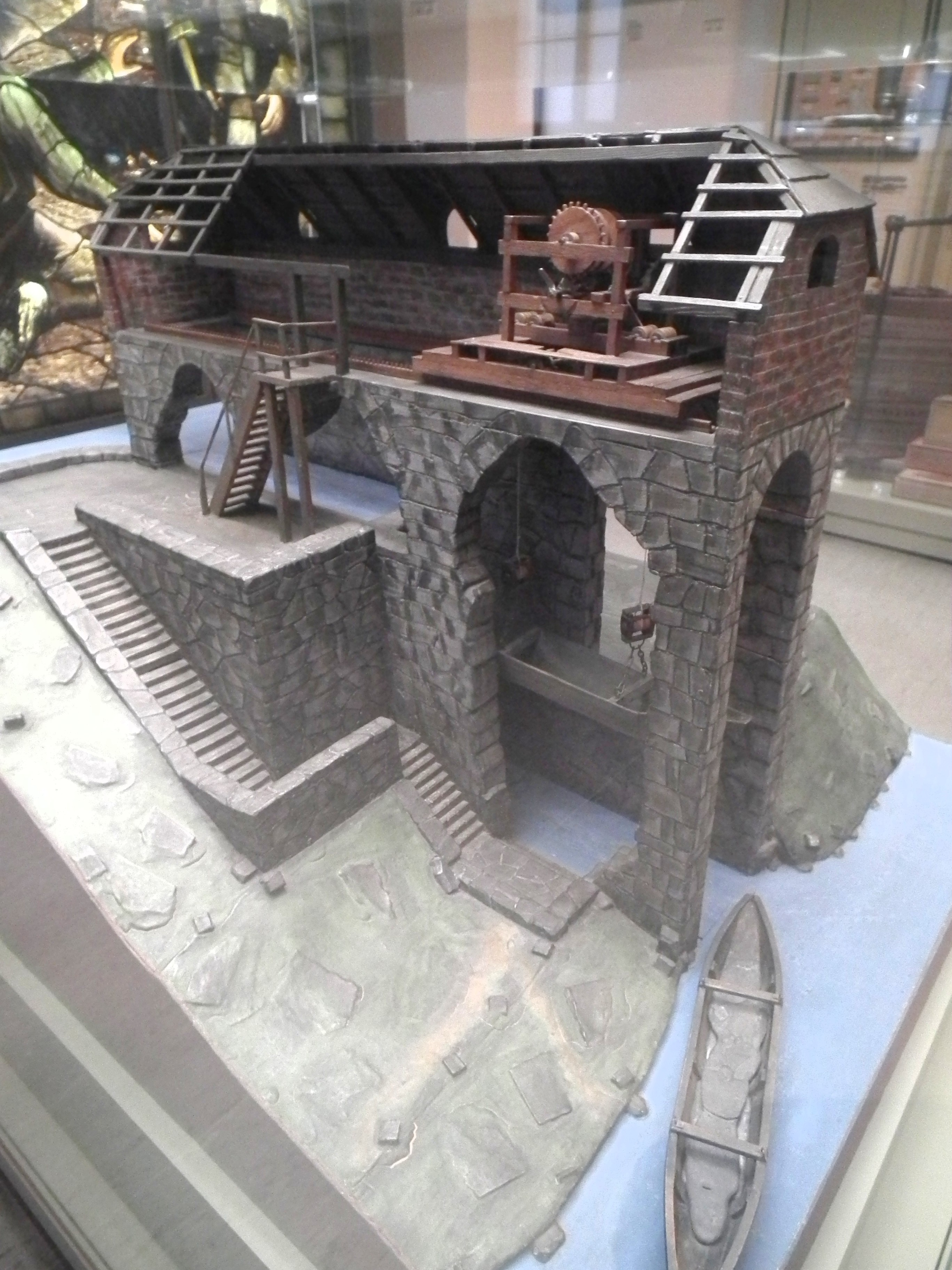
Kahnhebehaus Halsbrücke

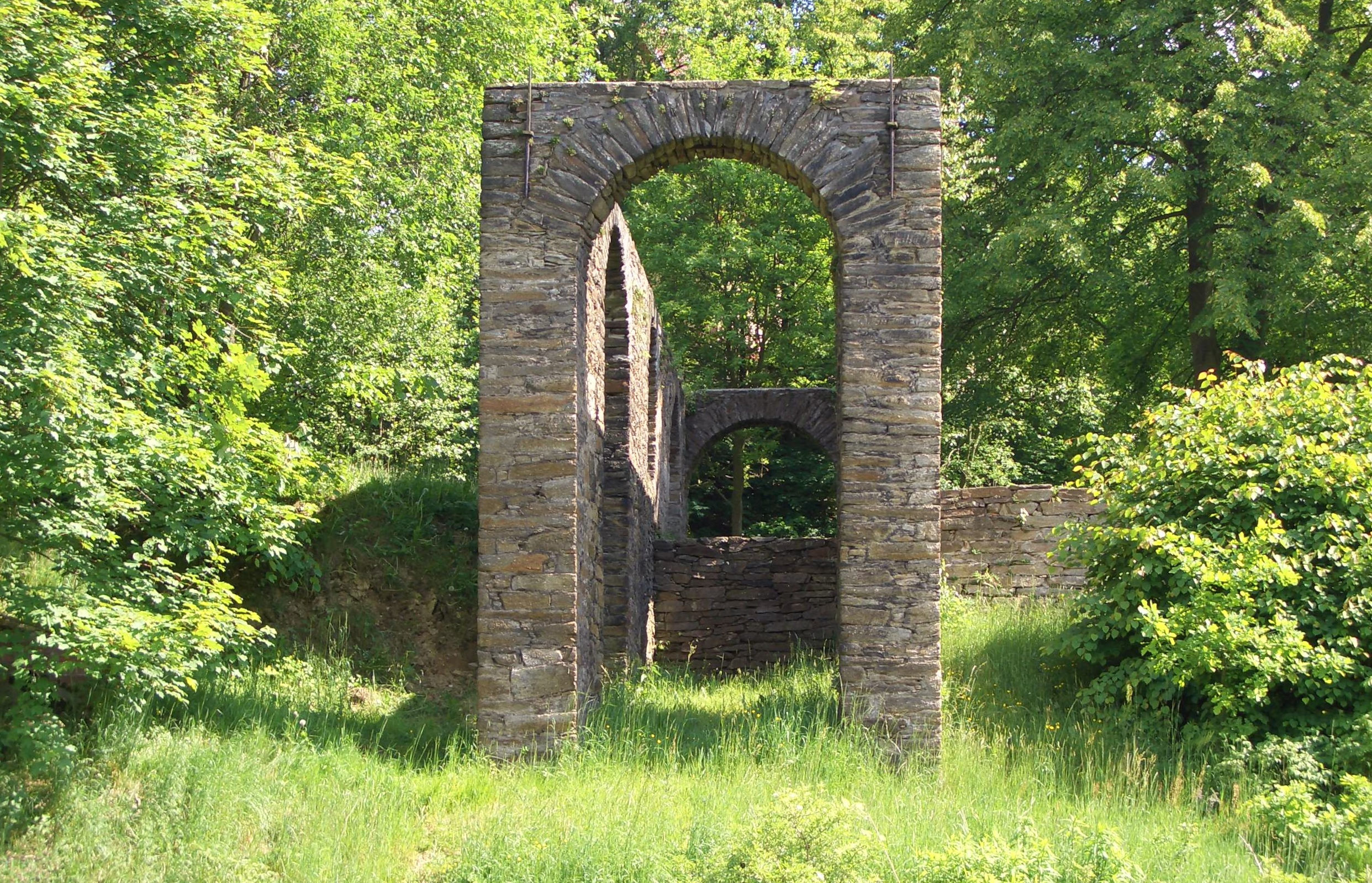
Kahnhebehaus Halsbrücke

A tub boat lift is a type of boat lift designed to lift tub boats between different elevations of a canal. Tub boats are small boats used to transport coal and other minerals, sometimes working singly, sometimes in long trains. A tub boat lift (German: Kahnhebehaus) lifts the boat out of the water. Most other types of boat lift such as locks or inclined planes are designed to move the boat afloat in some kind of water-filled tank, and, apart from maximum dimensions, are not restricted in the type of craft transported. Tub boat lifts and tub boats are designed to work together as a system. A given lift will only be able to lift boats designed for the lift.

== Operation ==
Tub boat lifts consisted of a moveable hoist travelling on four toothed wheels engaging with two toothed wooden rails, one mounted on each supporting wall. The hoist possessed two drums around which the lifting cables were wound. The lifting ropes passed through pulley blocks before being attached to lifting eyes on the boats to make the lift easier. Four men would wind the hoist when lifting a full 2.5 to 3 tonne tub boat until it was high enough to pass over the dam of the upper canal.

== Examples ==
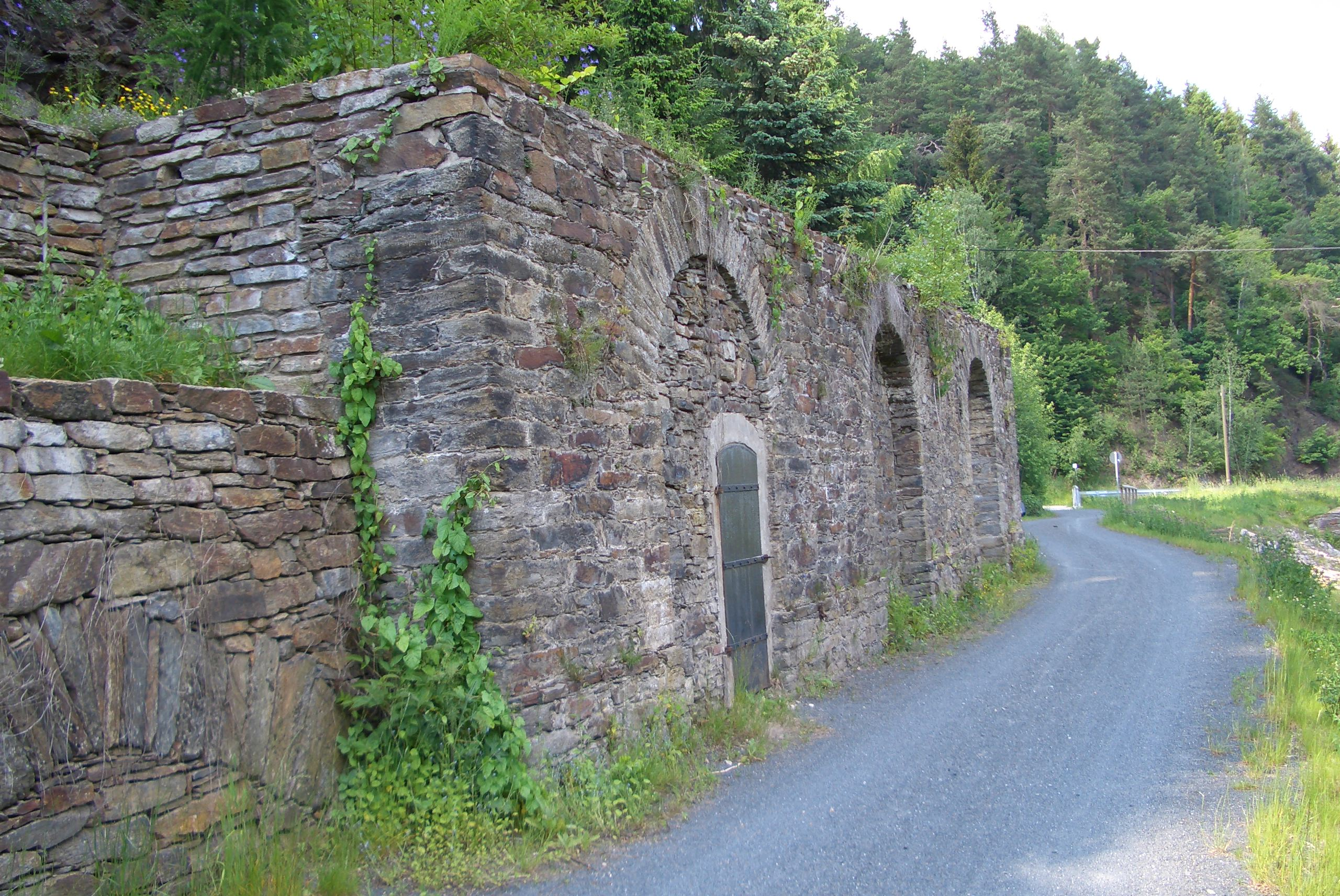
Kahnhebehaus Großvoigtsberg

The remains of two tub boat lifts can still be seen, in the same region of Germany.

- The Halsbrücke tub boat lift (also known as Rothenfurther Kahnhebehaus), was built in 1788/89 on the Freiberger Mulde. The remains of the Halsbrücke lift and the connecting section of the upper canal were restored in 1988. The tub boats used in this case were 8.5m long and 1.6m wide and when first used carried 2.5 tonnes, upgraded to 3 tonnes later in the canal and lift's working life. This lift worked until 1868.
- The Großvoigtsberg tub boat lift (also known as Christbescherunger Kahnhebehaus), in the neighbourhood of Freiberg, Saxony, was built in 1791 to overcome the difference in elevation between the Mulde and the Christbescherung mine canal. This canal was not completed, it is therefore possible that this lift was never used. The engineer in charge of the construction of both of these lifts was the Freiberg Kunstmeister Mechanicus Johann Friedrich Mende (1743–1798).
- A third tub boat lift was planned near Kleinvoigtsberg but was never built.

== See also ==
- Hay Inclined Plane, an inclined plane lift on the Ironbridge Gorge, lifting tub boats on wheeled carriages, rather than in caissons.
