= Boat lift =

Machine to move boats vertically between waterways

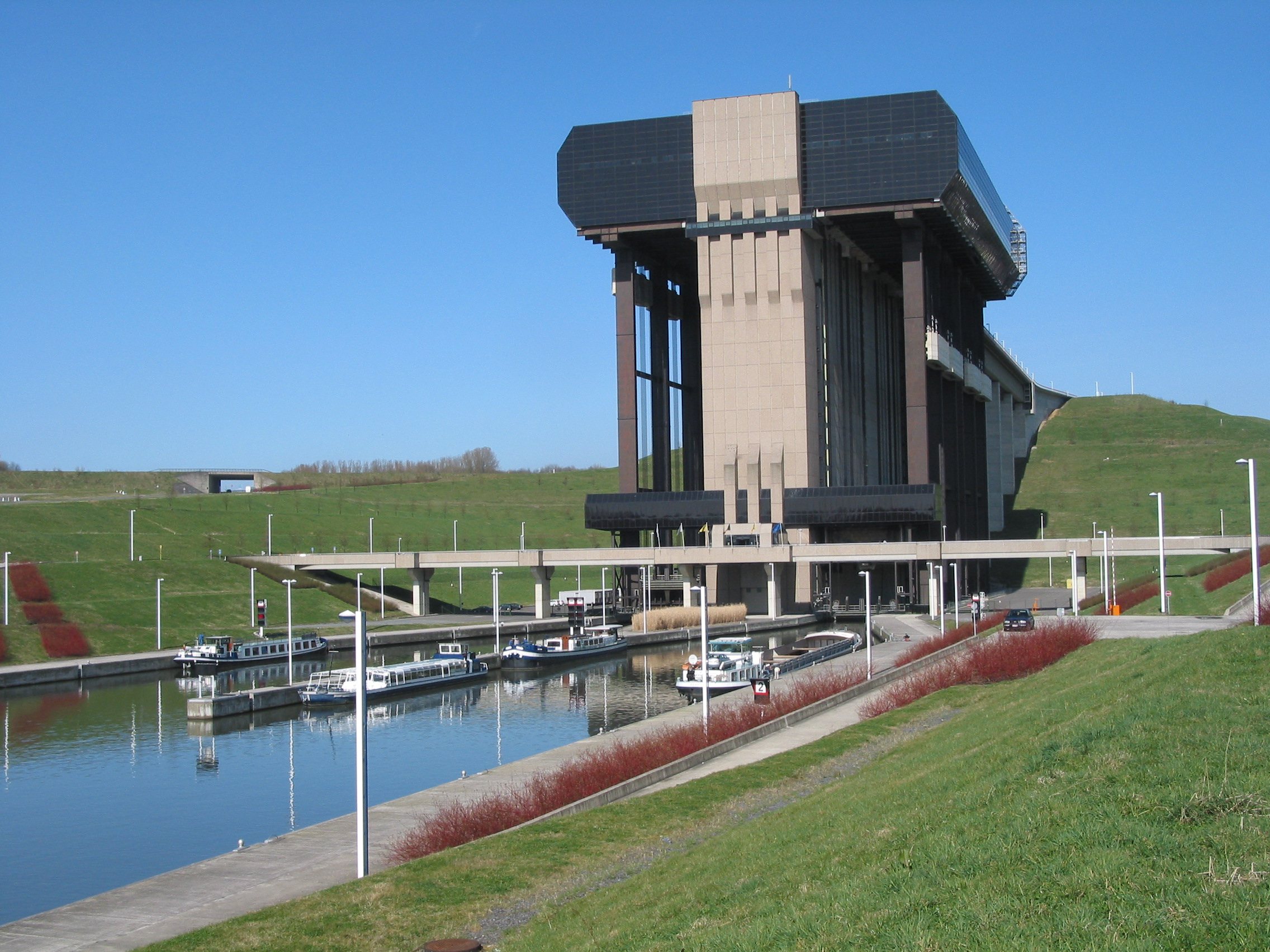
Strépy-Thieu boat lift (Belgium, Wallonia)

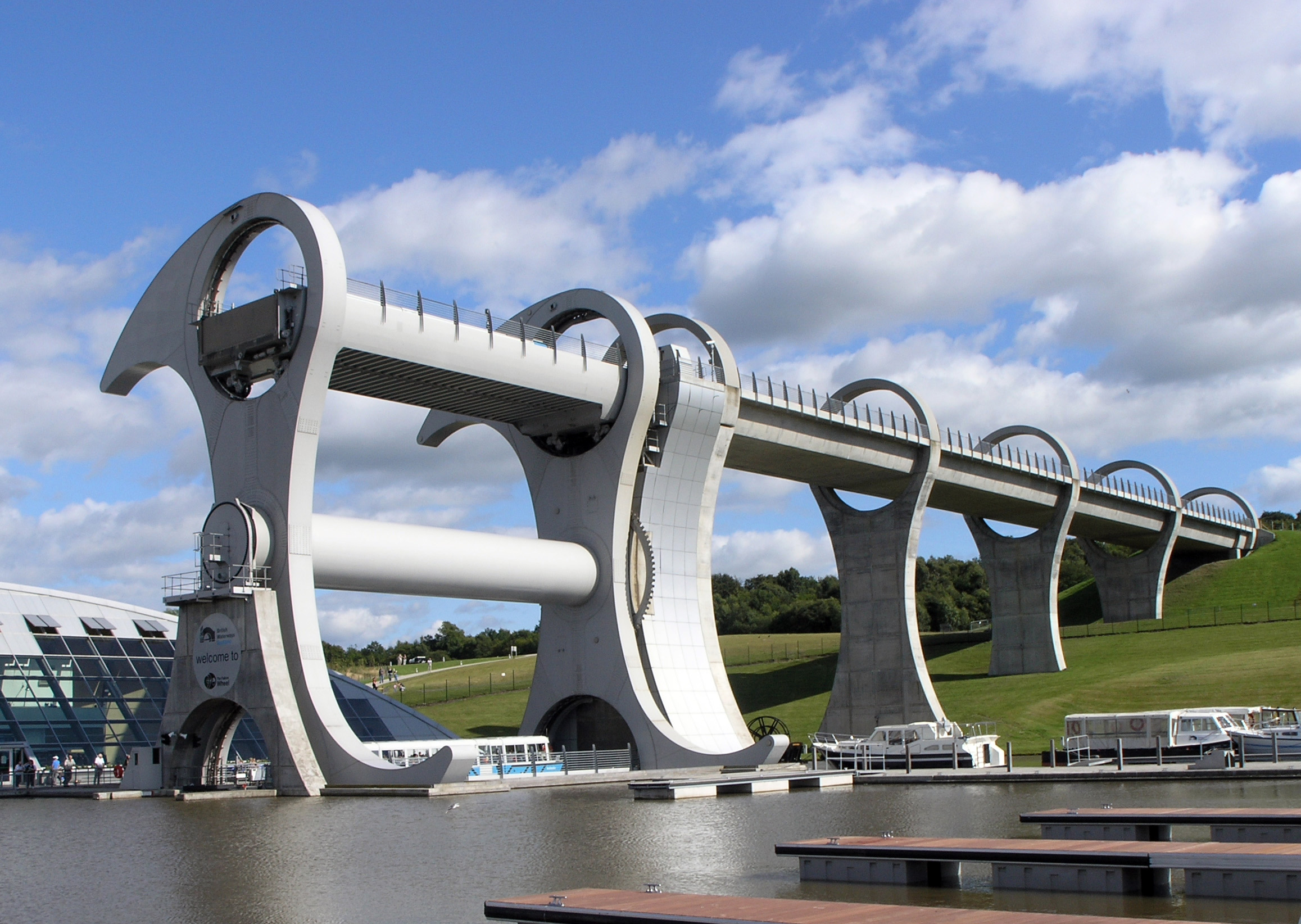
The Falkirk Wheel (Scotland)

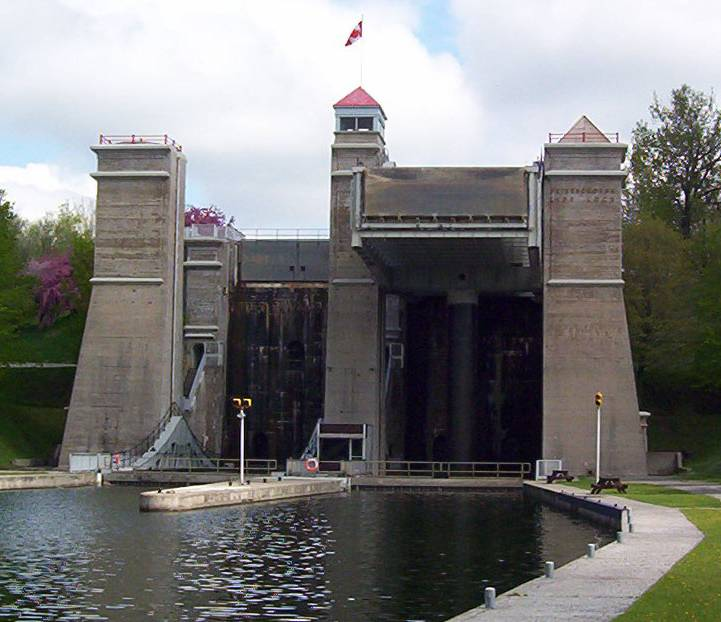
Peterborough Lift Lock (Canada)

A boat lift, ship lift, or lift lock is a machine for transporting boats between water at two different elevations, and is an alternative to the canal lock.

It may be vertically moving, like the Anderton boat lift in England, rotational, like the Falkirk Wheel in Scotland, or operate on an inclined plane, like the Ronquières inclined plane in Belgium.

== History ==
A precursor to the canal boat lift, able to move full-sized canal boats, was the tub boat lift used in mining, able to raise and lower the 2.5 ton tub boats then in use. An experimental system was in use on the Churprinz mining canal in Halsbrücke near Dresden. It lifted boats 7 m (23 ft) using a moveable hoist rather than caissons. The lift operated between 1789 and 1868, and for a period of time after its opening engineer James Green reporting that five had been built between 1796 and 1830. He credited the invention to Dr James Anderson of Edinburgh.

The idea of a boat lift for canals can be traced back to a design based on balanced water-filled caissons in Erasmus Darwin's Commonplace Book (pp. 58–59) dated 1777–1778

In 1796 an experimental balance lock was designed by James Fussell and constructed at Mells on the Dorset and Somerset Canal, though this project was never completed. A similar design was used for lifts on the tub boat section of the Grand Western Canal entered into operation in 1835 becoming the first non-experimental boat lifts in Britain and pre-dating the Anderton Boat Lift by 40 years.

In 1904 the Peterborough Lift Lock designed by Richard Birdsall Rogers opened in Canada. This 19.8-metre (65 ft) high lift system is operated by gravity alone, with the upper bay of the two bay system loaded with an additional 30 cm (12 in) of water as to give it greater weight.

Before the construction of the Three Gorges Dam Ship Lift, the highest boat lift, with a 73.15-metre (240.0 ft) height difference and European Class IV (1350 tonne) capacity, was the Strépy-Thieu boat lift in Belgium opened in 2002.

The ship lift at the Three Gorges Dam, completed in January 2016, is 113 m (371 ft) high and able to lift vessels of up to 3,000 tons displacement.

The boat lift at Longtan is reported to be even higher, with a maximum vertical lift of 179 m (587 ft) at the second level when completed.

== Selected lift locks ==
Notable lift locks – ordered by size
Name	Location	Opened	Type	Displacement	Dimensions	Vertical lift	Cycle time	Notes
Goupitan ship-lifting system (second lift)	Guizhou, China	2021	Vertical caisson	500 tons	280 by 35 by 5 metres 919 by 115 by 16 feet	127 metres 417 feet		Tallest boat lift in the world.
Goupitan ship-lifting system (first lift)	Guizhou, China	2021	Vertical caisson	500 tons		72–79 metres 236–259 feet		
Three Gorges Dam ship lift	Yichang, Hubei, China	2016	Vertical caisson	3000 tons	280 by 35 by 5 metres 919 by 115 by 16 feet	113 metres 371 feet	30–40 minutes	
Krasnoyarsk Dam ship lift	Divnogorsk, Krasnoyarsk Krai, Russia	1982	Inclined plane	1500 tons	90 m × 18 m × 2.2 m 295 ft × 59 ft × 7 ft	104 m 341 ft	90 minutes	
Ronquières inclined plane lift	Braine-le-Comte, Hainaut, Belgium	1968	Inclined plane	1350 tons	91 m × 12 m × 3.7 m 299 ft × 39 ft × 12 ft	67.73 m 222 ft	22 minutes	
Strépy-Thieu boat lift	Le Rœulx, Hainaut, Belgium	2002	Vertical caisson	1350 tons	112 m × 12 m × 3.35 m 367 ft × 39 ft × 11 ft	73.15 m 240 ft	7 minutes	Tallest boat lift in Europe.
Scharnebeck twin ship lift	Lüneburg, Lower Saxony, Germany	1974	Vertical caisson	1350 tons	105.4 m × 15.8 m × 3.4 m 346 ft × 52 ft × 11 ft	38 m 125 ft	3 minutes	
Niederfinow boat lift	Brandenburg, Germany	1934	Vertical caisson		85 m × 12 m × 2.5 m 279 ft × 39 ft × 8 ft	36 m 118 ft	20 minutes	
Niederfinow north boat lift	Brandenburg, Germany	2022	Vertical caisson	2100 tonnes	115 m × 12.5 m × 4.0 m 377 ft × 41 ft × 13 ft	36 m 118 ft		
Peterborough lift lock	Ontario, Canada	1904	Vertical caisson	1300 tons	42.7 m × 10.1 m × 2.1 m 140 ft × 33 ft × 7 ft	19.8 m 65 ft	10 minutes	
Kirkfield Lift Lock	Ontario, Canada	1907	Vertical caisson	1300 tons	42.7 m × 10.1 m × 2.1 m 140 ft × 33 ft × 7 ft	14.9 m 49 ft	10 minutes	
Rothensee boat lift	Saxony-Anhalt, Germany	1938	Vertical caisson	1000 tons	85 m × 12.2 m 279 ft × 40 ft	16 m 52 ft	20 minutes	
Falkirk Wheel	Falkirk, Scotland, United Kingdom	2002	Rotating caisson	600 tons	21.33 m × 6 m × 1.37 m 70 ft × 20 ft × 4 ft	24 m 79 fts	4 minutes	The only rotating boat lift in the world.
Henrichenburg boat lift	North Rhine-Westphalia, Germany	1962	Vertical caisson	600 tons	67 m × 8.2 m × 2 m 220 ft × 27 ft × 7 ft	14 m 46 ft	25 minutes	
Geheyan Dam ship lift	Hubei, China	1987	Vertical caisson	300 tons				
Longtan Dam ship lift (first lift)	Hechi, Guangxi Autonomous Region, China	2020	Vertical caisson	500 tons	73.0 m × 12.2 m × 3.5 m 240 ft × 40 ft × 11 ft	62.4 m 205 ft		
Longtan Dam ship lift (second lift)	Hechi, Guangxi Autonomous Region, China	2020	Vertical caisson	500 tons	73.0 m × 12.2 m × 3.5 m 240 ft × 40 ft × 11 ft	93.6 m 307 ft		
Canal du Centre boat lifts	Hainaut, Belgium	1888–1917	Vertical caisson	360 tons/350 tons	40.1 m × 5.06 m × 2 m 132 ft × 17 ft × 7 ft	16.93–15.4 m 56–51 ft		Three lifts each 16.93 m high plus one 15.4 m high.
Fontinettes boat lift	Arques, Pas-de-Calais, France	1881–88	Vertical caisson	300 tons	39 m × 5.2 m × 2 m 128 ft × 17 ft × 7 ft	13.13 m 43 ft	5 minutes	Replaced by a single lock in 1967.
Anderton boat lift	Cheshire, England, United Kingdom	1875	Vertical caisson	250 tons	22.9 m × 4.7 m × 2.9 m 75 ft × 15 ft × 10 ft	15.25 m 50 ft		
Montech water slope	Montech, Tarn-et-Garonne, France	1974	Water slope		443 m × 13.3 m × 6 m 1,453 ft × 44 ft × 20 ft	13.3 m 44 ft	6 minutes	Oldest water slope.
Fonserannes Water Slope	Hérault, France	1980–1983	Water slope		272 m × 13.6 m 892 ft × 45 ft	13.6 m 45 ft		
Big Chute Marine Railway	Ontario, Canada	1917–1978	Patent slip		30.4 m × 18 m × 7.9 m 100 ft × 59 ft × 26 ft	18 m 59 ft		

== See also ==
- List of boat lifts
- Lock (water transport)
- Balance lock
- Canal inclined plane – another technique for lifting boats
- Caisson lock – a submerged boat lift
- Shiplift – used for raising vessels in shipyards
- Marine railway inclined plane for shipyards
- Water slope
- Saint-Louis-Arzviller boat lift, France – which is actually a canal inclined plane
- Portable boat lift
- Patent slip
