= Peterborough Lift Lock =

Boat lift

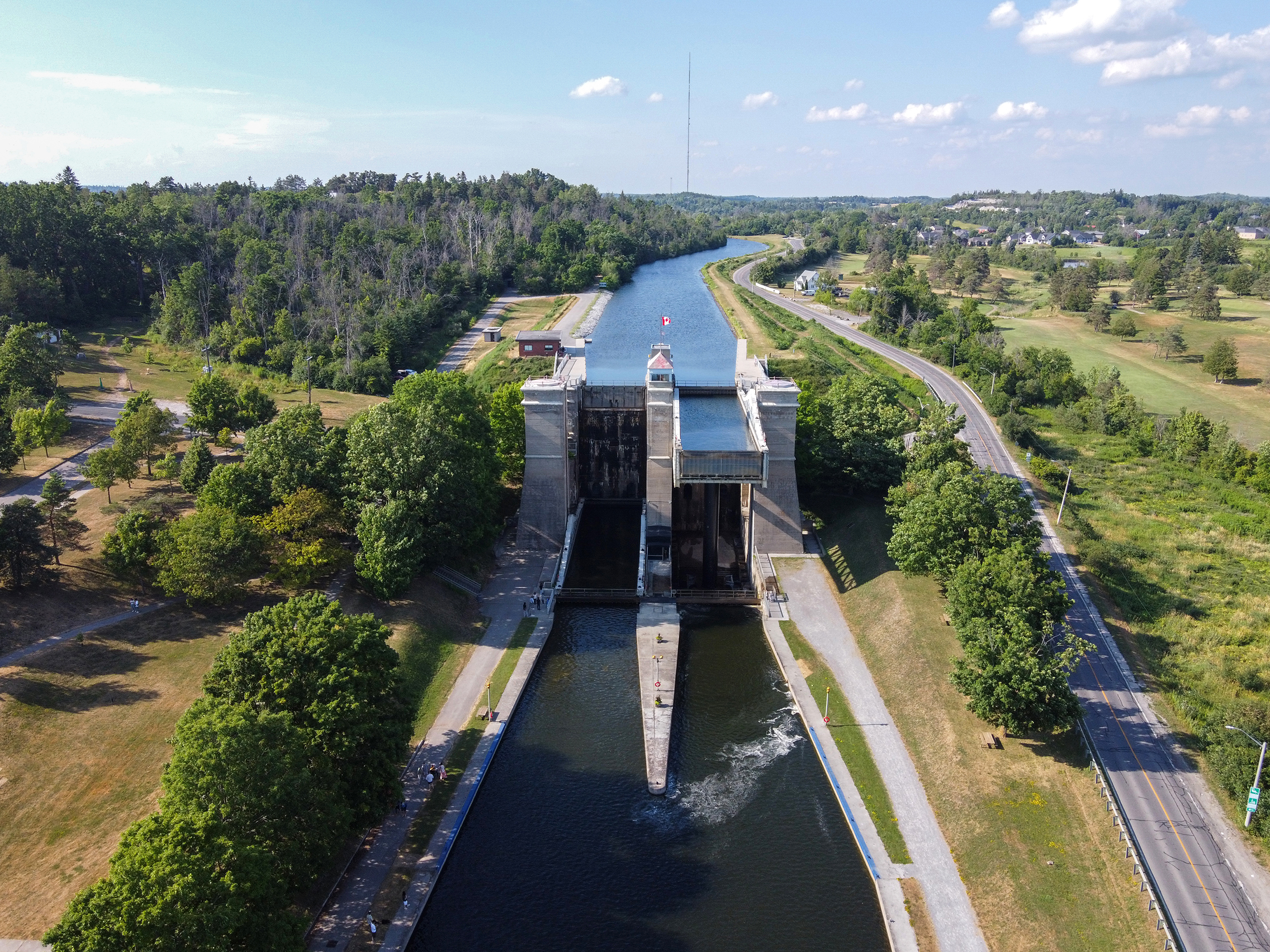
- Aerial view of the Peterborough Lift Lock
- Interactive map of Peterborough Lift Lock
- 44°18′27″N 78°18′03″W
- Waterway: Trent-Severn Waterway
- Country: Canada
- Province: Southern Ontario
- Maintained by: Parks Canada
- Operation: Hydraulic
- First built: 1904
- Latest built: 1980s
- Length: 43 metres (141 ft)
- Width: 10 metres (33 ft)
- Fall: 19.8 metres (65 ft 0 in)

National Historic Site of Canada
- Designated: 1979

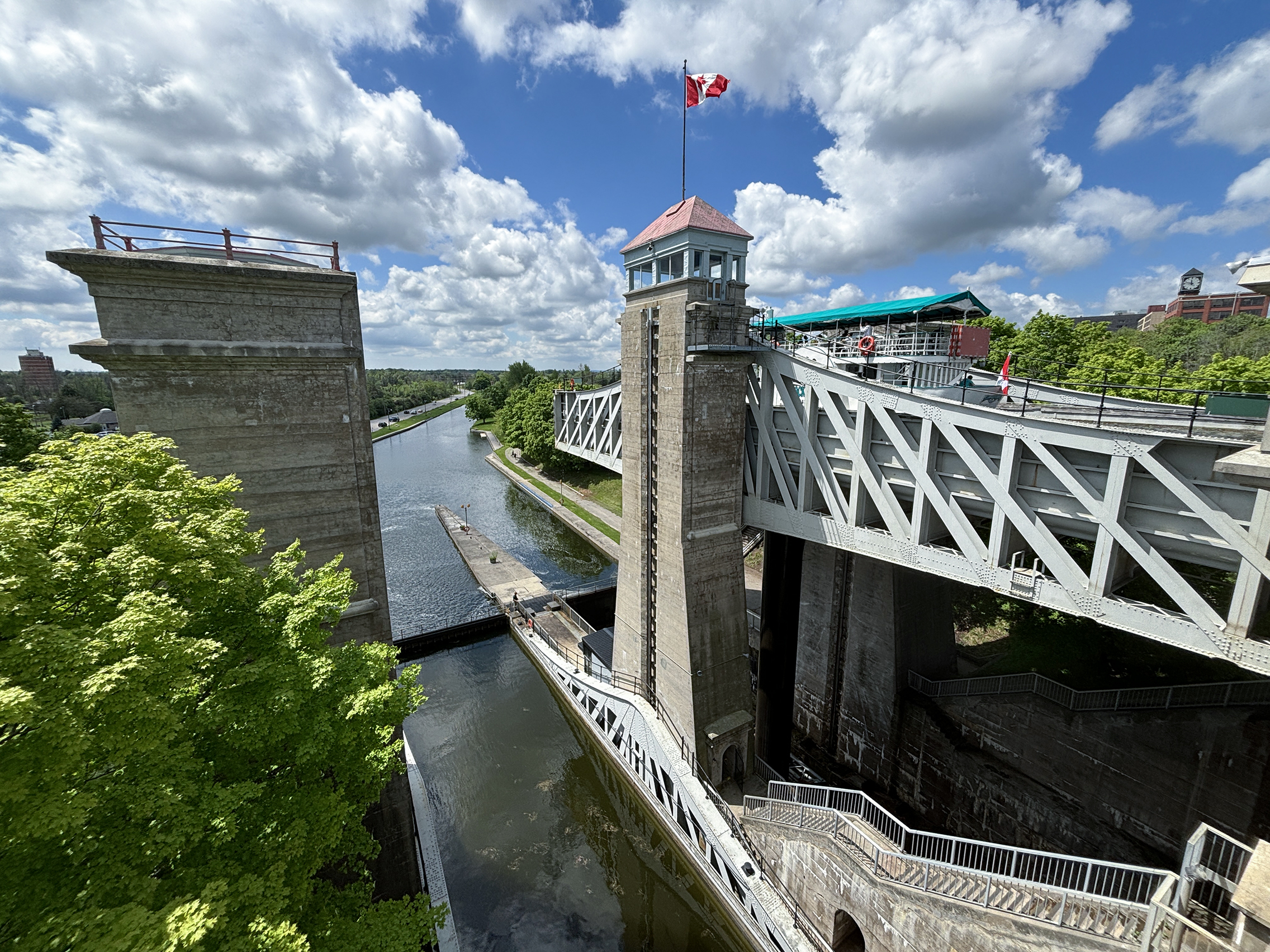
Peterborough Lift Lock view from top

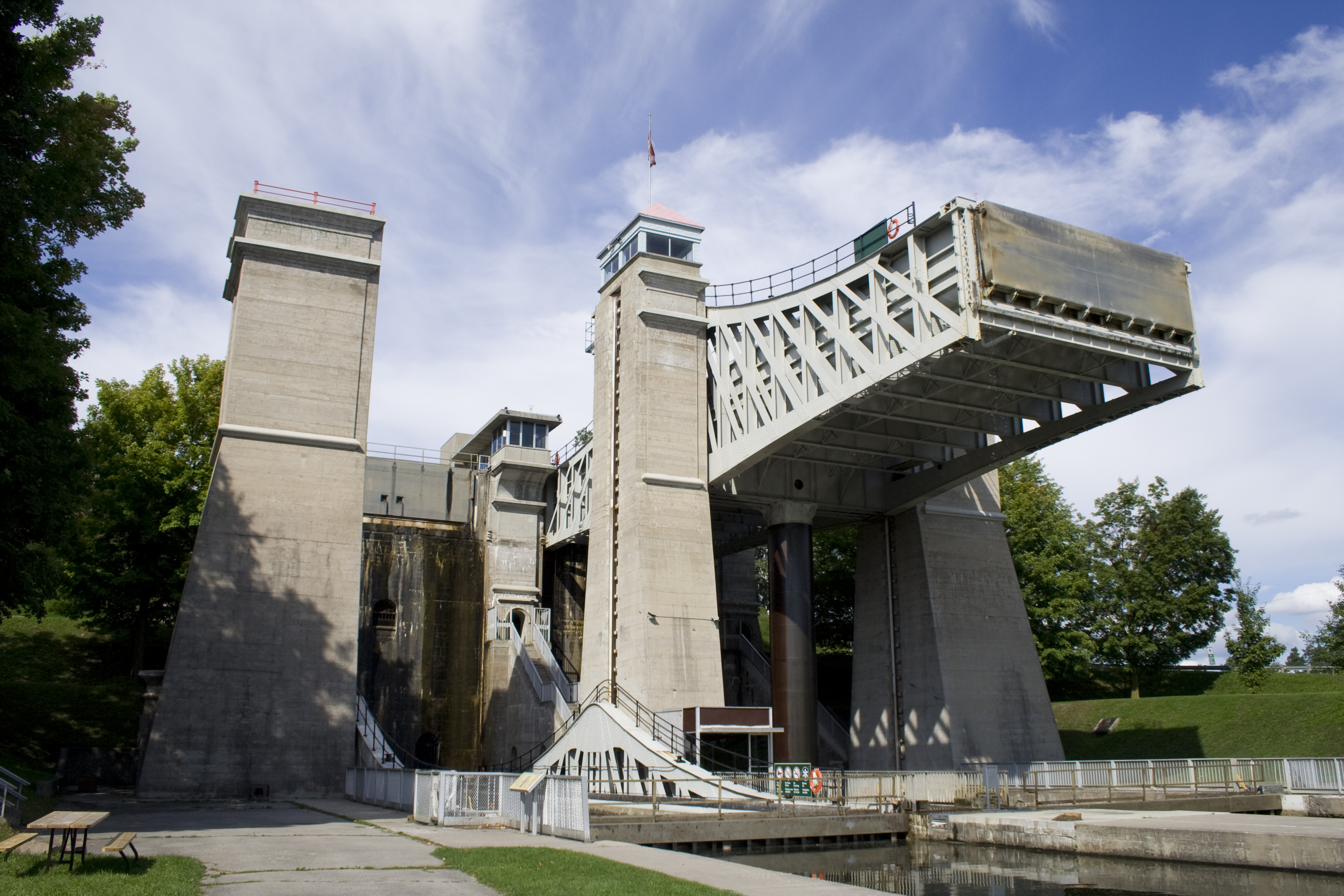
Peterborough Lift Lock (side view)

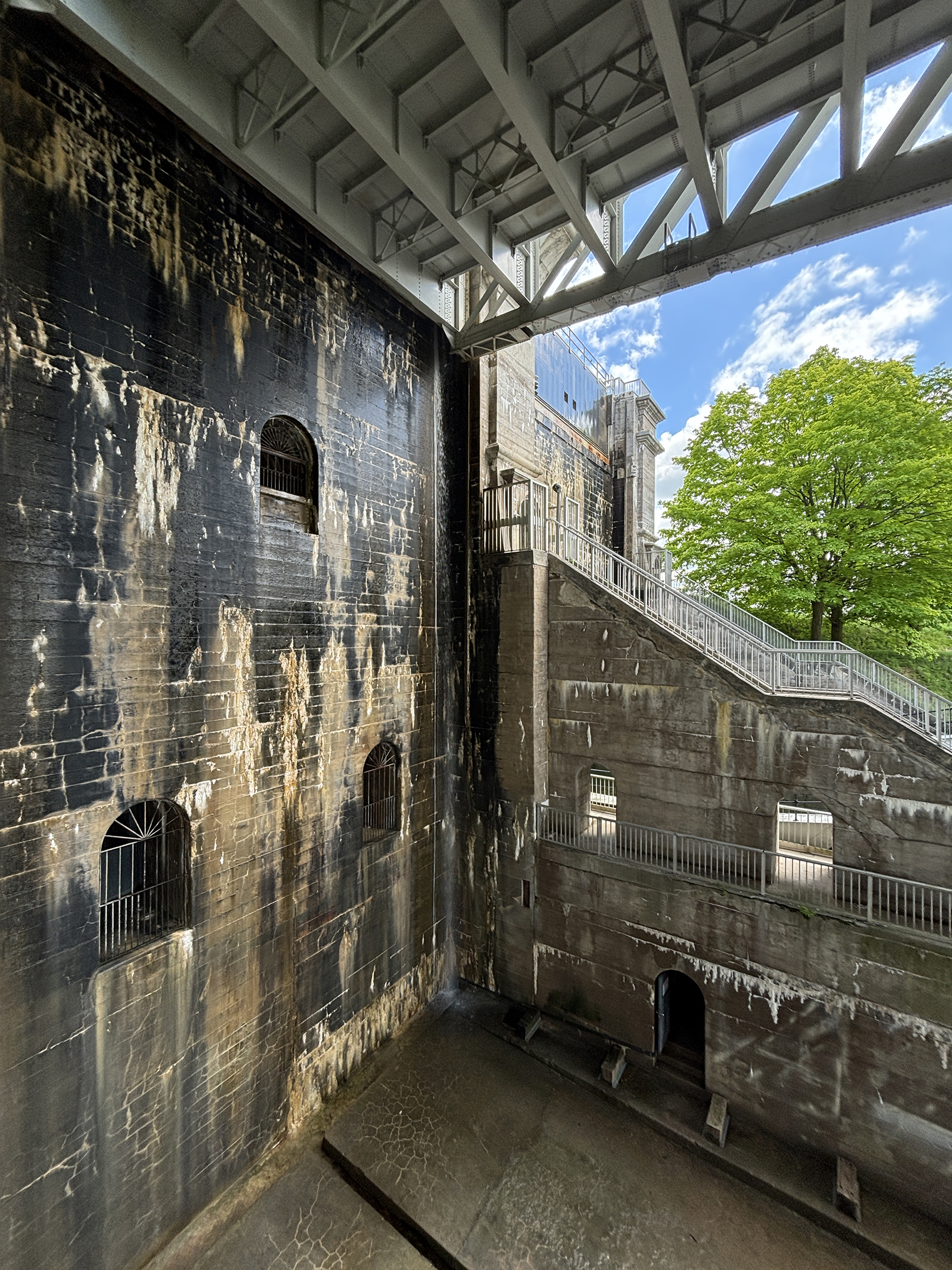
Windows behind lift Lock

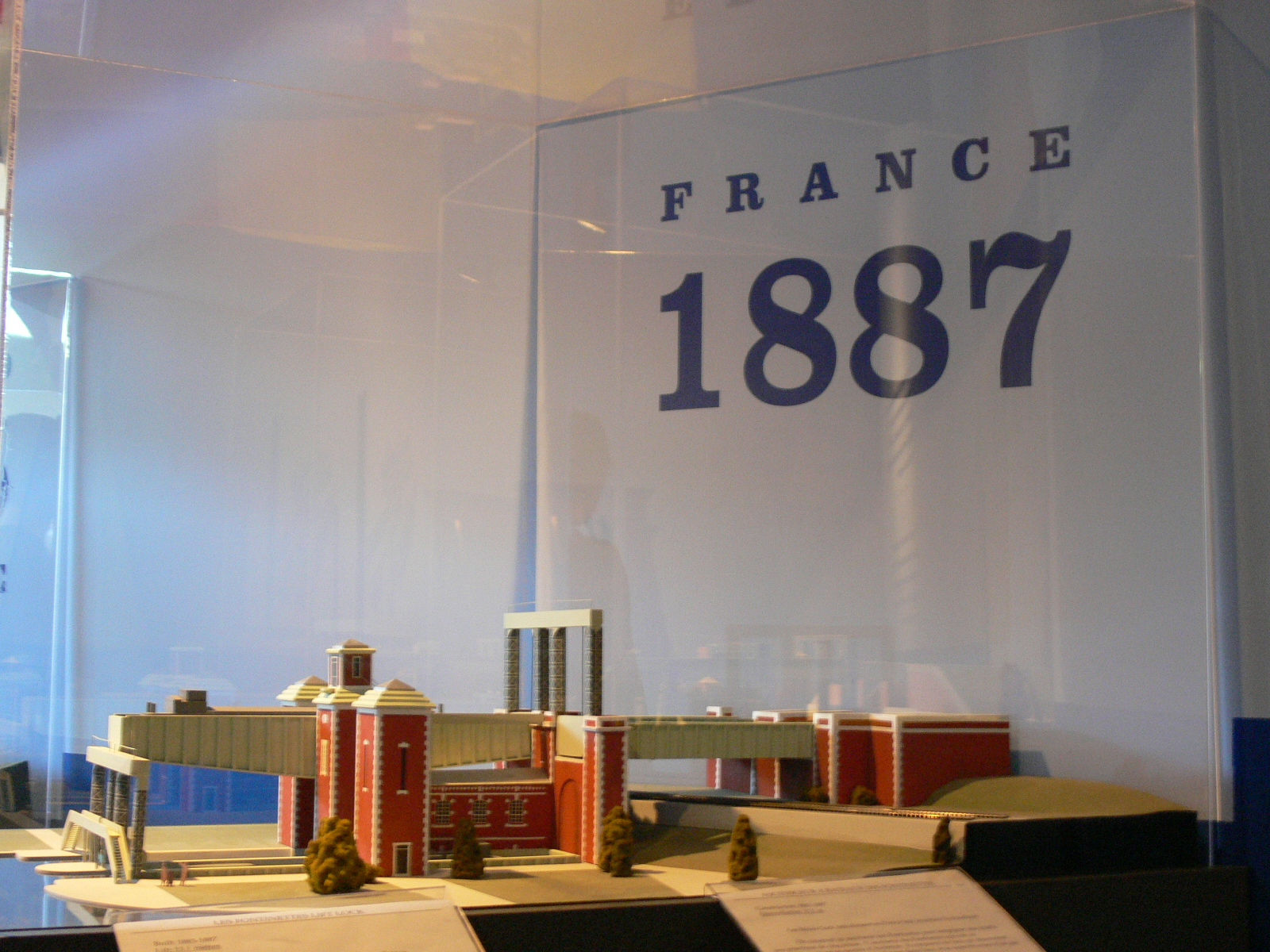
Exhibition of historical lift models at the Peterborough Lift Lock

The Peterborough Lift Lock is a boat lift located on the Trent Canal in the city of Peterborough, Ontario, Canada, and is Lock 21 on the Trent-Severn Waterway.

For many years, the lock's dual lifts were the highest hydraulic boat lifts in the world, raising boats 65 ft (20 m). This was a considerable accomplishment in the first years of the 20th century, when conventional locks usually only had a 7 ft (2.1 m) rise.

In the 1980s, a visitor centre was built beside the lock. It offers interactive simulations of going over the lift lock in a boat, and historical exhibits detailing the construction of the lift lock.

Residents and visitors skate on the canal below the lift lock in the winter.

The Peterborough Lift Lock was designated a National Historic Site in 1979, and was named an Historic Mechanical Engineering Landmark by the American Society of Mechanical Engineers in 1987.

The Trent-Severn has a similar hydraulic lift lock, the Kirkfield Lift Lock, at its summit near Kirkfield, with basins of the same dimensions, but which has a smaller vertical lift.

== Description and operation ==
The lock has two identical bathtub-like ship caissons in which vessels ascend and descend. Both caissons are enclosed at each end by pivoting gates, and there are pivoting gates at the upper and lower reaches of the canal at the junctions with the caissons. The gates on the caissons fit into slots on the gates on the reaches, so that they open in unison.

Each caisson sits on a 7.5 ft (2.3 m) diameter ram, the shafts for which are sunk into the ground, are filled with water, and are connected with a pipe that has a crossover control valve. The caissons are guided up and down on either side by rails affixed to concrete towers.

The caissons are 140 ft (43 m) long, 33 ft (10 m) wide, and 7 ft (2.1 m) deep and when filled with 228,093 imperial gallons (1,036.93 m^{3}; 1,036,930 L) of water weigh 1,700 short tons (1,500 t).

No external power is needed: the lift lock functions by gravity alone using the counterweight principle. One caisson always ascends and the other always descends during each locking cycle. When one caisson reaches the top position, it stops 12 inches (30 cm) below the water level of the upper reach, and the control valve is closed; Siemens ultrasonic sensors are used to help determine the differential. The upper reach and top caisson gates open, and water flows into the top caisson until the level equalizes. The weight of the extra foot of water is 144 short tons (131 t), making the total weight of the upper caisson 1,844 short tons (1,673 t). Any vessels that just ascended in the top caisson exit into the upper reach, and any new vessels making a transit of the lock then enter the bottom or top caisson from the lower or upper reach respectively. Once the vessels are secured, all gates are closed and the crossover valve in the connecting pipe between the ram shafts is opened. Since the upper caisson weighs more than the lower caisson (1,844 vs 1,700 tons), it pushes down on its ram, forcing out water from its shaft via the connecting pipe into the shaft of the bottom caisson. The force pushes up on the bottom caisson's ram, raising the caisson up to the top position. When the gate of the newly descended top caisson and lower reach gates open at the bottom, the extra foot of water flows out and equalizes with the water level in the lower reach of the canal, and any descended vessels exit, allowing the cycle to start over again.

== History ==
The lift lock was designed by Richard Birdsall Rogers, a superintendent of the Trent Canal (part of the Trent-Severn Waterway). In 1896, he travelled to France, Belgium and England to see existing examples in operation.

Part of the reason that the lift lock was built was political. At the time a federal election was taking place and in order to shore up local support the project was fast tracked. In 1896 construction was approved and contractors signed on prior to any real working drawings being ready. The government still fell, and Richard Rogers, who was concerned about his links to the former administration, only released portions of the working drawings bit by bit. It worked, allowing him to remain on the job as the main designer.

The final project included many engineering firsts. It was the first lock to be built out of concrete, and at the time was the largest structure ever built in the world with unreinforced concrete.

Construction was by Corry and Laverdure of Peterborough, which excavated the site and built the concrete towers and lock, and Dominion Bridge Company of Montréal, which completed the metal work including rams, presses and large caissons, and was finished in 1904. The lift lock officially opened to the public to a crowd of thousands on 9 July 1904, and remains in full use today.

== See also ==
- List of boat lifts
- Canal lock
