= Jeremy Vine (TV programme) =

British TV programme

- Genre: Talk show News programme
- Presented by: Jeremy Vine; Storm Huntley; Alexis Conran; Michelle Ackerley; Dawn Neesom; Claudia-Liza Vanderpuije; Matt Allwright
- Country of origin: United Kingdom
- Original language: English
- No. of episodes: 1,000 (up to 11 August 2022)

Production
- Camera setup: Multi-camera
- Running time: 295 minutes (inc. adverts); 135 minutes (Jeremy Vine); 75 minutes (Storm & Alexis); 90 minutes (Matt Allwright)
- Production company: ITN Productions

Original release
- Network: Channel 5
- Release: 3 September 2018 – present

Related
- The Wright Stuff (2000–2018)

Jeremy Vine, Storm & Alexis and Matt Allwright are three daytime current affairs programmes produced by ITN Productions for 5. The slot housing the 3 programmes broadcasts from 9:15 am to 2:20 pm every weekday.

The main programme of the slot, which is presented by Jeremy Vine, is a continuation of Channel 5's previous morning debate show The Wright Stuff with much of the same format as its predecessor. Originally a single programme that broadcast since September 2018, the slot was expanded to include a standalone programme for co-host Storm Huntley in June 2023 and expanded further in March 2025 and January 2026 to include additional self-titled programmes hosted by Vanessa Feltz and Matt Allwright.

== Show formats and presenters ==
=== Jeremy Vine ===
Jeremy Vine is a British television chat and topical debate show presented by Jeremy Vine and Storm Huntley. Running since 3 September 2018, it is the successor to The Wright Stuff, hosted by Matthew Wright for over 18 years, and uses the same graphics, format, concept, studio and theme music. The show has Vine and a bunch of celebrity panelists who debate the latest news, views, and headlines.

Currently, the show runs from 9:15 am to 11:30 am. The show is fronted by Vine, with guest cover presenters filling in for him when on holiday or poorly.

Presenters
Name	Title	Duration
Jeremy Vine	Main presenter	Sep 2018-
Storm Huntley	Main cover presenter	Jan 2021-
Claudia-Liza Vanderpuije	Main cover presenter	Oct 2021- December 2022
Anne Diamond	Main cover presenter	Sep 2018-Dec 2020
Dawn Neesom	Deputy cover presenter	Aug 2022-
Georgie Barrat	Guest cover presenter	Aug 2024
Matt Allwright	Guest cover presenter	Aug 2024
Angelica Bell	Guest cover presenter	Jun 2021
Trisha Goddard	Guest cover presenter	Aug 2021
Vanessa Feltz	Guest cover presenter	Jul 2024- June 2026
Rob Rinder	Guest cover presenter	
Susan Calman	Guest cover presenter	
Isabel Webster	Guest cover presenter	Jan 2026-
Charlotte Hawkins	Guest cover presenter	Jun 2026-

==== Co-presenters ====
A main feature returning from the former programme The Wright Stuff is that there is a male or female co-host who sits in the audience area. This role is currently performed by Storm Huntley, who previously worked on The Wright Stuff and was carried over to Jeremy Vine. From 2020, the co-host returned to the booth due to the COVID-19 pandemic, before moving next to the panellists in May 2022, and being dropped from the main show in 2022, due to the rebranding of "Jeremy Vine Extra".

Co-presenters
Name	Title	Duration
Storm Huntley	Co-presenter	Sep 2018-
Dawn Neesom	Deputy co-presenter	Jun 2022-
Alexis Conran	Cover co-presenter	Aug 2022
Michelle Ackerley	Cover co-presenter	Sep 2022
Vanessa Feltz	Cover co-presenter	Aug 2024
Matt Allwright	Cover co-presenter	Apr 2025
Rezzy Ghadjar	Deputy co-presenter	2019-2021
Will Njobvu	Deputy co-presenter	2019
Rachel Schofield	Cover co-presenter	Sep 2020
Tessa Chapman	Cover co-presenter	Mar 2022
Radzi Chinyanganya	Cover co-presenter	
Amanda Lamb	Cover co-presenter	
Cherry Healey	Cover co-presenter	
Rhiannon Jones	Cover co-presenter	

==== Regular panellists ====
- Henry Bonsu (2018–)
- Anne Diamond (2018–2021)
- Angela Epstein (2018–)
- Jemma Forte (2018–)
- Sarah Jarvis (2018–)
- Owen Jones (2018–)
- Nicola McLean (2018–)
- Carole Malone (2018–)
- Dawn Neesom (2018–)
- Mike Parry (2018–)
- Lowri Turner (2018–)
- Nina Myskow (2018–)
- Ann Widdecombe (2018–2026)
- Ash Sarkar (2019–)
- Cristo Foufas (2021–)
- Yasmin Alibhai-Brown (2018–)
- Narinda Kaur (2022–)
- Marina Purkiss (2022–)
- Lin Mei
- Kevin Maguire
- Michael Walker
- James Max
- Albie Amankona (2022-)

=== Storm and Alexis ===
On 17 January 2022, Channel 5 and ITN Productions announced that the Jeremy Vine slot would be extended by an hour from the 19th. Known as Jeremy Vine Extra, this slot was exclusively fronted by Storm Huntley as Vine hosts his BBC Radio 2 show during the slot. The first cover presenter, Tessa Chapman, hosted the show on 23 March. Dawn Neesom hosted from 27 June to 1 July due to Huntley having COVID-19.

It was announced on 6 July 2022 that during Huntley's maternity leave, Neesom would take over in July and early August and Alexis Conran and Michelle Ackerley will take over from the second Monday of August and the first Monday of September, respectively. It was also announced that the show will be extended to end at 12:45 pm from 1 August 2022 onwards due to the ending of Australian soap opera Neighbours. Following Conran's final show on 2 September 2022, Neesom returned to present the first week of Ackerley's duration before Ackerley joined the following week. After Ackerley's final show, Conran returned for the following week, followed by Neesom for the week after.

In May 2023, Huntley announced on her Twitter account that Jeremy Vine Extra would be renamed to Storm Huntley from 15 May, due to her being the main presenter of that segment of the show, while Channel 5 announced that the programming would be further extended into the afternoon with Alexis Conran presenting after Huntley. On 26 June, Storm Huntley was extended from an hour to 11:15 am to 12:40 pm, with the time being taken off the Alexis Conran programme and Jeremy Vine remaining the same at 2 hours long.

By 2025, Storm Huntley ran from 11:30 am to 12:30 pm. After Vanessa's first series wrapped up, the show's slot was briefly extended to run from 11:30 am to 1:25 pm.

Beginning in January 2026, Alexis Conran was added as permanent co-presenter (after he previously filled in for Huntley during her maternity leave in 2025) and the program's slot was renamed as Storm & Alexis, airing from 11:30 am to 12:45 pm.

=== Alexis Conran and Friends ===
From 15 May 2023, the morning show on Channel 5 was extended, with ITN producing segments from the end of Milkshake! to the beginning of Home and Away. Notwithstanding the ITN-produced news bulletin at the end, the last segment between 12:15 pm and 1:40 pm was renamed Alexis Conran with the channel's consumer advice programming presenter continuing the morning's discussions. Conran was a previous stand-in host for Vine and Huntley and has also presented numerous series like Phone Scams: Don't Get Caught Out and Secrets of Fast Food Giants for the channel. From Monday 26 June 2023, the Alexis Conran programme became an hour long part of ITN's morning current affairs block on Channel 5, with the show running from 12:40 pm and the extra time being given over to Storm Huntley.

When the programme came back after the Christmas 2023 period, the series was moved to the 12:45 pm to 1:40 pm slot and was reformatted as Alexis Conran and Friends, now focusing on social issues instead of the recent news and politics as its sister shows do. The show ended its run on 29 March 2024, with its slot being taken over by other shows on Channel 5 until the launch of Vanessa the following year.

=== Vanessa ===
In March 2025, ITN launched a Vanessa Feltz–fronted daytime chat show titled Vanessa, which uses much of the same graphics as Jeremy Vine and Storm Huntley and follows the latter, airing from 12:30 pm to 1:40 pm.

Beginning with the show's second series in January 2026, the program has run from 2 pm to 3 pm. This also saw a set and graphics change.

On 18 June 2026, it was reported that the series had been axed by Channel 5 due to poor viewership ratings and a failure to stop repeated prank callers. 5 confirmed that they would take back the slot once the second series ends its run.

=== Matt Allwright ===
In December 2025, Channel 5 and ITN Productions extended their partnership to include an additional programme fronted by Matt Allwright which would expand ITN's morning current affairs block to run until 3 pm. The show airs from 12:50 pm to 2 pm, following a brief 5 News update after Storm & Alexis and preceding Vanessa.

Beginning 20 July 2026, the series was extended by 20 minutes, and now ends at 2:20 pm.

== Studio and production ==
The show is currently being filmed and produced by Channel 5 and ITN Productions.

The shows airs live though before the change to Jeremy Vine Extra the final 45 minutes of the main show was pre-recorded, due to Vine's live BBC Radio 2 weekday lunchtime show at 12 noon, at around 8:00 am, to allow Vine to travel to Wogan House for his radio show.

In May 2023, Channel 5 announced that the three shows and 5 News would no longer be available to watch on their catch-up service My5.
