= Muir High School =

Muir High School may refer to:

- John Muir High School, Pasadena, California, United States
- Bishopbriggs Academy, Bishopbriggs, Scotland, once known as Thomas Muir High School
