= Storm Huntley =

Scottish television presenter (born 1987)

- Born: 24 February 1987 (age 39); Bishopbriggs, Scotland
- Education: Bishopbriggs High School
- Alma mater: University of Glasgow (MA); London College of Communication (PGDip)
- Occupation: Television presenter
- Years active: 2014–present
- Known for: STV Glasgow (weather / The Riverside Show); CBeebies (Down on the Farm); Channel 5 (The Wright Stuff / Jeremy Vine / Storm Huntley)
- Spouse: Kerr Okan (m. 2021)
- Children: 2

Storm Danielle Huntley (born 24 February 1987) is a Scottish television presenter.

== Early life and education ==
Huntley's first name was chosen from a combination of her mother reading a novel where the lead had this name (A Sparrow Falls by Wilbur Smith) and an electrical storm outside on the day she was born. Her grandmother refused to use this name for some time.

As a toddler, she accidentally poured a kettle of boiling water over herself, causing permanent scarring to her arm, shoulder and neck; she chooses clothing to conceal the scars.

Raised in Bishopbriggs in the northern part of Greater Glasgow, she attended Bishopbriggs High Schoolthen Gordonstoun School in Elgin, Morayshire before taking a degree in politics and economics from the University of Glasgow in 2008. She became involved in the university station's Subcity Radio as well as hospital radio, spent time in London with a local community radio company (OnFM) and took a postgraduate diploma in broadcast journalism from the London College of Communication.

== Television career ==
After a period of unpaid work experience, she found work as a researcher with BBC Scotland, became increasingly interested in weather reporting and took a short meteorology course with the Open University.

In June 2014 Huntley joined STV's new local STV Glasgow channel, presenting weather forecasts and features on its evening daily Riverside Show.

=== Current work ===
Since 2015, Huntley has been involved in three shows on British terrestrial television - the seasonal CBeebies show Down on the Farm and The Wright Stuff and its replacement Jeremy Vine. Down on the Farm was nominated for a BAFTA Scotland Award in 2016.

On Channel 5's daily live morning phone-in debate programme The Wright Stuff and its 2018 replacement Jeremy Vine, she is a co-host, screening and introducing callers to the hosts Matthew Wright and Jeremy Vine and reading out viewer correspondence. Since June 2023 she hosts her own solo show from 11:30 (when Vine leaves for his midday BBC Radio 2 programme) through to 12.30, in which she continues the viewer interaction on the topics of the day.

== Personal life ==
On 30 October 2020, Huntley announced her engagement to Kerr Okan, lead vocalist of The LaFontaines. They married on 2 September 2021 on the banks of Loch Lomond. Huntley gave birth to their son, Otis, on 11 July 2022. They welcomed their daughter Sloan on 15th March 2025.
