= Henry Bonsu =

British radio presenter

- Born: 1967 (age 58–59); Manchester, England
- Education: Magdalen College, Oxford (Modern Languages)
- Occupations: Radio presenter, journalist
- Known for: Presenter on Times Radio (late-evenings), former panellist on The Wright Stuff
- Notable work: Times Radio, BBC, The Voice, Black Britain

Henry Bonsu (born 1967) is a British radio presenter and former print journalist. He presents on Thursday and Friday late-evenings on Times Radio.

== Background ==
Bonsu was born in Manchester and is of Ghanaian heritage. He studied Modern Languages at Magdalen College, Oxford between 1986 and 1990.

== Career ==
Bonsu initially worked as a print journalist at the Manchester Evening News and The Voice, a newspaper covering issues affecting Black people in the UK. He then joined the BBC as a producer. At the BBC, Bonsu he worked on several news and current affairs programmes which were broadcast on radio. In the mid-1990s, Bonsu joined Black Britain, a programme on BBC Two.

Bonsu carried out in-depth, documentary-style reporting for the BBC; for example, in 2001, Bonsu reported for Crossing Continents from Zurich about the demise of the airline Swissair. Also for example, in 2007, Bonsu presented a series for BBC Radio 4 about those Africans who were perpetrators and perpetuators of the slave trade.

In 2002, Bonsu started appearing regularly as a panellist on The Wright Stuff, a morning news discussion and celebrity interview programme on Channel 5. In the same year, Bonsu began working as a reporter for Channel 4 breakfast show RI:SE from the point of its launch.

In 2004, Bonsu was axed from BBC London 94.9 (now known as BBC Radio London), the BBC Local Radio station for London, because he was told he was "too intellectual" for the radio station. Whilst at the station, he presented in several different timeslots. Following his axing, he accused the BBC of not adequately covering issues affecting Black people. Bonsu helped to create Colourful Radio, a London radio station aimed at Black people which launched in 2006. As of 2007, he was presenting the station's drivetime show, which contained speech content aimed at Black people; in the same year, the station was broadcasting on digital radio.

By 2009, Bonsu had been a news commentator on BBC Radio 5 Live. From 2009 until 2014, Bonsu presented the programme Shoot The Messenger on Vox Africa. From 2008 until 2011, he presented on BET International. From 2009 until 2015, he presented on Press TV, a news channel funded by the Iranian government.

In the past, Bonsu has appeared regularly to review the following morning's newspapers on the BBC News channel's The Papers.

Bonsu joined Times Radio as a stand-in presenter in 2021, and in 2022 he was given the regular slots of 10pm-1am on Thursday and Friday nights. He continues to present in these slots. Bonsu's show is unique in that although the show covers hard-hitting and current affairs topics, Bonsu lets his midnight guest choose a snippet of a song to be played to start the midnight hour.

By 2022, Bonsu had carried out a considerable amount of conference moderation for the United Nations. He has also moderated a range of other conferences on broad topics.

Bonsu is a regular panellist on Jeremy Vine, a weekday morning TV show on Channel 5 normally presented by Jeremy Vine in which guests talk about the morning's news.

== Personal life ==
Bonsu is a fluent speaker of German and French.
