= JB Gill =

British singer

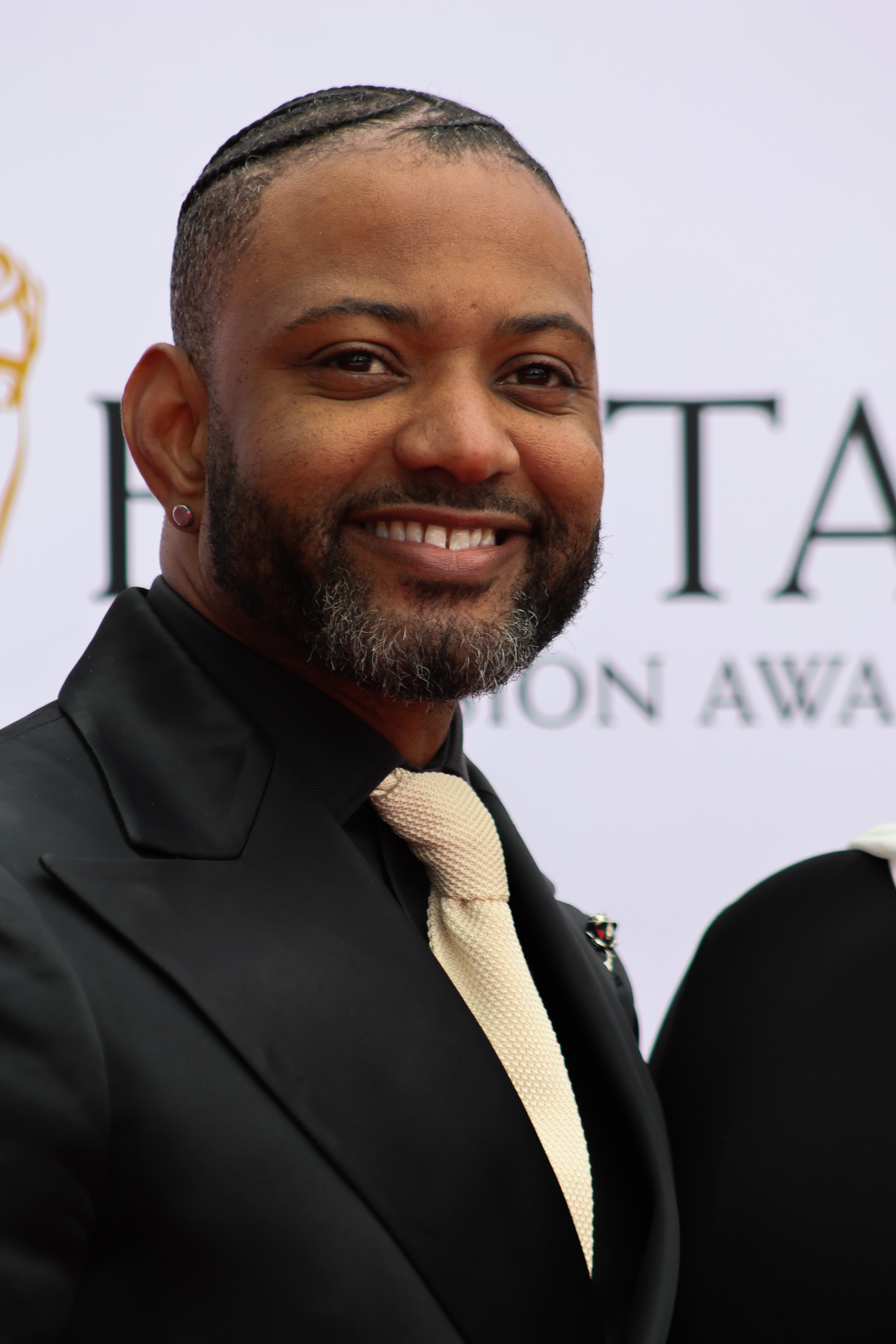
- Gill at the 2026 British Academy Television Awards
- Born: Jonathan Benjamin Gill; 7 December 1986 (age 39); Croydon, London, England
- Occupations: Singer, television presenter, farmer
- Years active: 2006–present
- Agent: Arlingtontalent.com
- Television: The X Factor (2008); The Jump (2015); Dance Dance Dance (2017)
- Spouse: Chloe Tangney (m. 2014)
- Children: 2
- Musical career
- Genres: Dance, pop, R&B
- Instrument: Vocals
- Years active: 2006–2014, 2020–present
- Labels: Epic; RCA; Sony; O-Street
- Member of: JLS
- Website: jbgill.com

Jonathan Benjamin Gill (born 7 December 1986), also known professionally as JB Gill, is a British singer, dancer, television presenter and farmer. He is best known as a member of the boy band JLS, who were runners-up to Alexandra Burke on the fifth series of The X Factor in 2008. With JLS, he went on to achieve five no. 1 singles, over 10 million record sales worldwide, two Brit awards, and five MOBO awards, before the band split up in 2013. His later career saw him presenting television shows Down on the Farm (2015) and Songs of Praise (2017) and, since March 2025, a regular co-presenter on The One Show.

== Early life ==
Jonathan Benjamin Gill was born on 7 December 1986 in Croydon, London, England. He is the son of Cynthia, and Keith Gill and has one younger brother, Neequaye. He is of Antiguan descent. He grew up, mostly, in Croydon, and began making music at the age of seven when he played the recorder, piano, and flute. At an early age, he joined the primary school choir, and went on to perform at the local church. Gill concentrated on his music and began studying at The Centre for Young Musicians. He was awarded 'all-round' scholarship for music, academics and sport at Whitgift School in Croydon.

In secondary school, he switched focus from music to rugby; he got involved with London Irish rugby club and toured abroad. He eventually gave rugby up through injury, and took up vocal coaching during a year out before attending university. He studied theology at King's College London, but put his degree on hold, to pursue his music career with JLS.

== Career ==
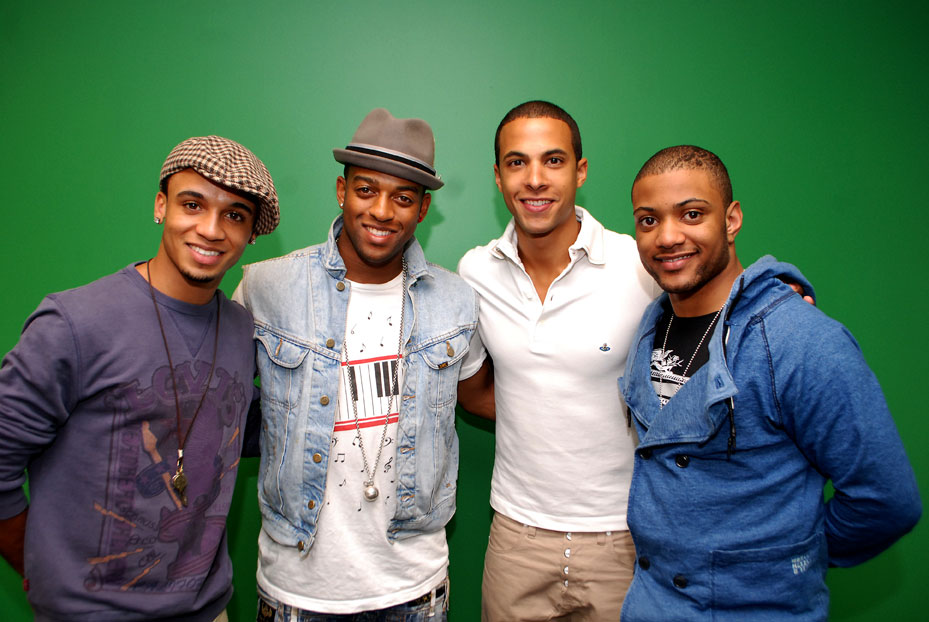
JLS appearing at KISS FM 103.5 Chicago Radio on 20 April 2010

Gill joined boy band UFO, later known as JLS, in 2007. The group auditioned for The X Factor in 2008, managed by Louis Walsh, and finished runners-up behind Alexandra Burke. They later signed a record deal with Epic Records, achieving five no. 1 singles, over 10 million record sales worldwide, two Brit awards, and five MOBO awards, but split up in 2013.

In December 2012, Gill won the Christmas Special of the BBC One dancing show Strictly Come Dancing, performing the Jive with Ola Jordan.

In 2014, Gill sang on a song titled "Best Night OML" produced by Charlie Hedges. This made him the first member of JLS to release solo material. Later that year, Gill competed on Celebrity MasterChef. Beginning on 1 February 2015, he took part in the second series of The Jump.

In August 2015, having been involved in the turkey farming industry for some years, he became one of the main presenters on CBeebies programme Down on the Farm alongside Storm Huntley.

In November 2015, he appeared on the show, Countryfile. In September 2016, he appeared on Who's Doing the Dishes?. In February 2017, he appeared on the ITV show Dance Dance Dance alongside his wife Chloe and finished in 3rd place. From 2017, he has been a presenter on the BBC's Songs of Praise.

In August 2024, 12 years after winning the Christmas special, Gill was announced as a contestant on the twenty-second series of Strictly Come Dancing. He was originally partnered with Amy Dowden for the first six weeks of the series. He then re-partnered with Lauren Oakley from week 7 onwards, after Dowden fell ill and later withdrew due to injury. The pair ultimately reached the final, finishing as runners-up behind Chris McCausland and his partner Dianne Buswell.

== Personal life ==
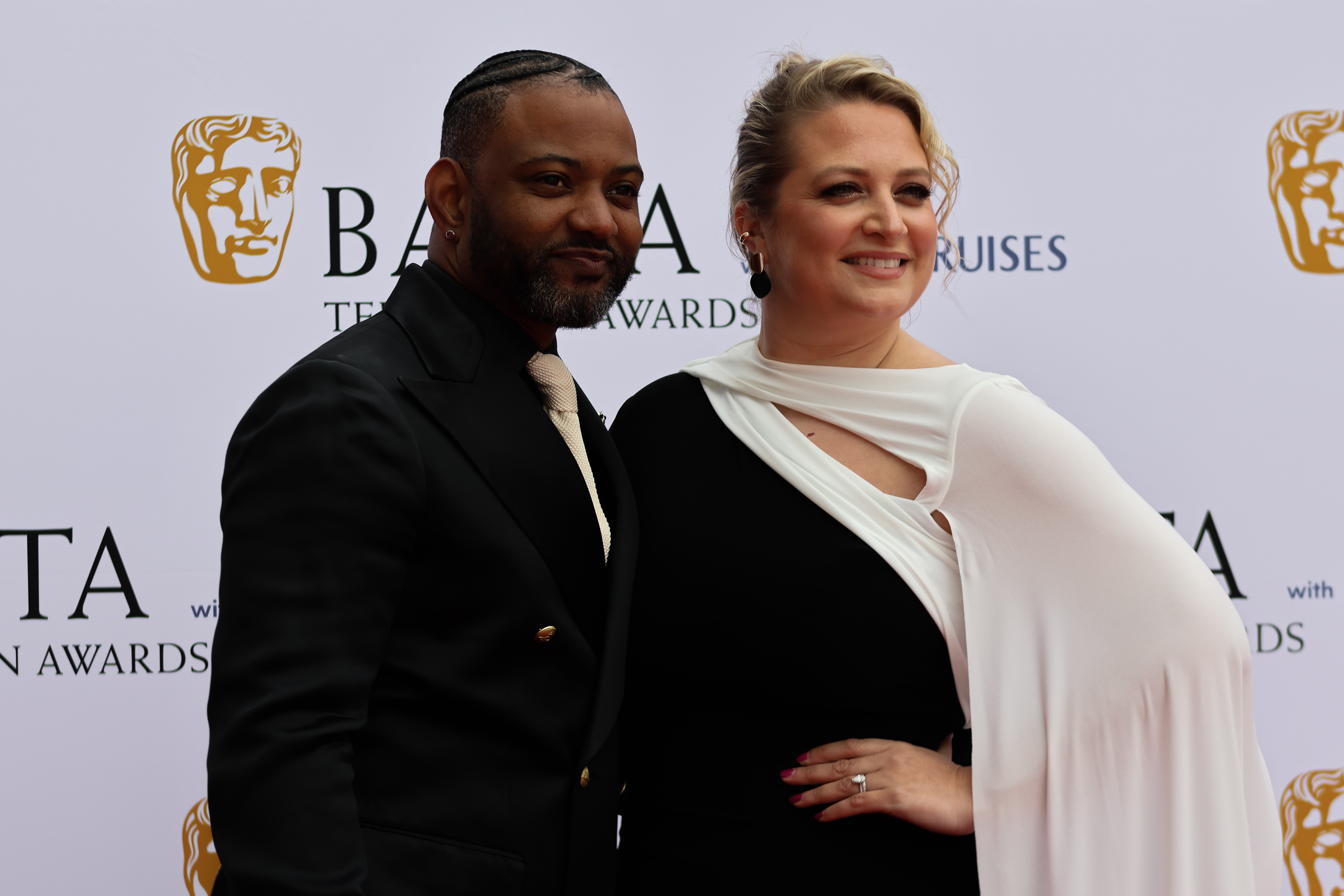
Gill and Tangney in 2026

Gill used to play rugby, and played for England in the 2015 charity fixture of Rugby Aid, which sees a team of celebrities and professional rugby players take part in an 'England vs The Rest of the World' match to raise money for the charity Help For Heroes, which supports members of the British Armed Forces community with their health, financial, social and welfare needs.

In late 2008, Gill began dating backing dancer Chloe Tangney; they married in 2014 and have two children: a son called Ace Jeremiah Gill and a daughter called Chiara Sapphire Gill. Gill is a Christian.

Gill is a supporter of charities, including the Red Cross, for which he travelled to Zimbabwe for a food relief effort, and the Woodland Trust, the largest woodland conservation charity in the UK.

== Filmography ==
Television

- The X Factor (2008) – Contestant, as part of JLS
- Countryfile (2012) – Guest
- The Paul O'Grady Show (2014) – Guest
- Celebrity MasterChef (2014) – Contestant
- The Jump (2015) – Contestant
- Down on the Farm (2015–present) – Presenter
- The Chase Celebrities (2015) – Contestant
- Tipping Point Lucky Stars (2016) – Contestant
- Dance Dance Dance (2017) – Contestant
- Songs of Praise (2017–present) – Presenter
- Richard Osman's House of Games (2018) – Contestant
- Cooking with the Gills (2022–present) – Presenter
- Strictly Come Dancing (2024) – Contestant
- Tractor Ted (2025–present) – Presenter
- "Britain’s Best Service Station 2026 – Presenter
- The Box (2026) – Contestant
