= Sarah Jarvis (disambiguation) =

Sarah Jarvis is a doctor.

Sarah Jarvis may also refer to:

- Sarah Jarvis, character in Action in the North Atlantic
- Sarah Jarvis (skier), in FIS Alpine World Ski Championships 2011 – Women's giant slalom
