= Bishopbriggs Academy =

Coordinates: 55°54′29″N 4°12′10″W

Location
- Wester Cleddens Road; Bishopbriggs, East Dunbartonshire, G64 1HZ; Scotland

Information
- Type: State secondary school
- Motto: Educating, Inspiring, Empowering
- Established: 2006
- Headteacher: Ian Donaghey
- Gender: Co-educational
- Enrolment: Maximum of 1200
- Houses: Burns, MacDonald, Thomson, Kelvin, Fleming, and Muir
- Colour: Tie Colours Badge Colours
- School years: S1-S6
- Affiliated schools: Thomas Muir, Wester Cleddens, Balmuildy, and Meadowburn
- Website: www.bishopbriggs.e-dunbarton.sch.uk

Bishopbriggs Academy is a secondary school in the town of Bishopbriggs, Scotland, in the district of East Dunbartonshire. Bishopbriggs Academy is a non-denominational, co-educational, comprehensive school taking pupils from S1 to S6. It is currently one of two secondary schools in Bishopbriggs, along with Turnbull High School at Brackenbrae.

The school was established in August 2006 as a result of the amalgamation of Bishopbriggs High School and Thomas Muir High School.

In 2021, the school was named "The Scottish State Secondary School of the decade" by the Sunday Times in the Sunday Times School Guide, recognising the "exceptional leadership, top quality teaching and high academic standards that the school provides." It has also twice been named 'The Scottish State Secondary School of the Year' by the Sunday Times in the Sunday Times School Guide, firstly in 2014 and again in 2017. The school consistently ranks at the top of the school exam league tables, with the school currently ranking 10th in the league tables (out of 340 secondary schools in Scotland).

In January 2013 the school received four "Excellent" grades and one "Very Good" in an Education Scotland Inspection Report. This was the first time ever that education Education Scotland had awarded four "Excellent" grades under the new inspection standards which ranks school on 5 areas. The Inspectors also described the Academy as an 'outstanding school'.

== History ==
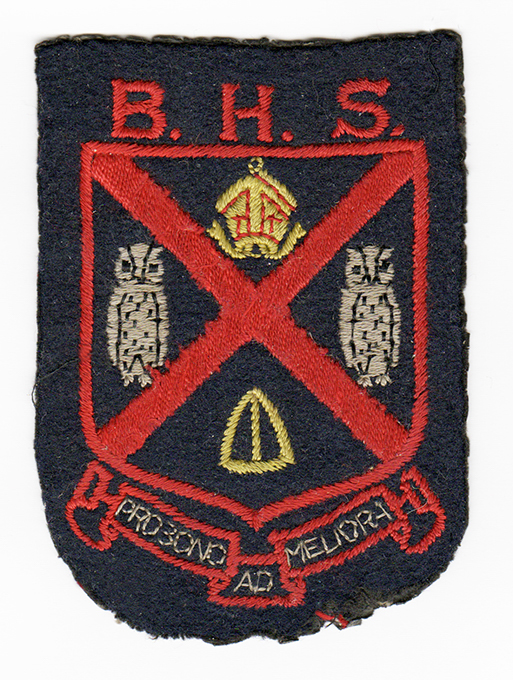
Bishopbriggs High School Blazer Badge

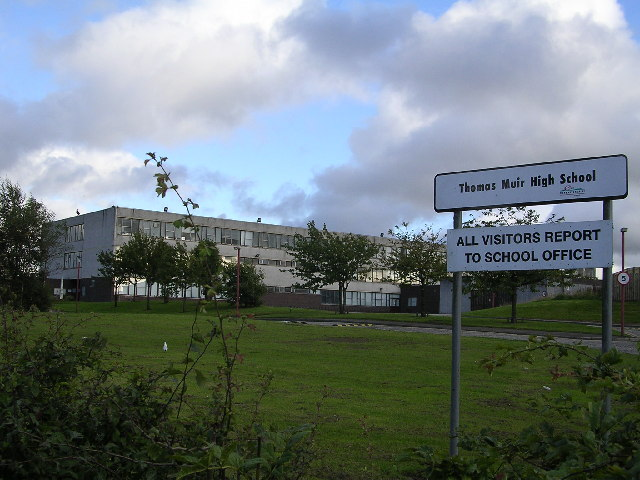
The old Thomas Muir High school building.

The two antecedent secondary schools were originally established to meet local demand during Bishopbriggs' housing boom beginning in the 1960s.

Bishopbriggs High School was opened by Lanark County Council in 1965 and designed by Simon Pollard. It replaced the previous Bishopbriggs Higher Grade School which had originally opened in 1896, designed by David Woodburn Sturrock, and featured inscriptions on its clock tower, commemorating the Diamond Jubilee of Queen Victoria that year. This catered only for pupils up to S4 with most leaving at age 15 (S3); Higher Grade pupils transferred to Lenzie Academy in Dunbartonshire. The school and its pupils appeared in an award-winning 1959 amateur film, L' Inspecteur. The former Bishopbriggs Higher Grade School building was converted into the town library after the completion of the new High School building.

Thomas Muir High School was named after the local historical political radical, Thomas Muir, and opened in 1978 to serve the expanding Woodhill area of the town. The Thomas Muir name was continued for use for a new primary school in Bishopbriggs (an amalgamation of Woodhill Primary and Auchinairn Primary), completed in 2017.

=== New academy ===
Bishopbriggs High School and Thomas Muir High School merged in 2006 to form Bishopbriggs Academy as part of a £100million PPP plan to build six new secondary schools in East Dunbartonshire. The school is now situated at the site of the former Thomas Muir High School on Wester Cleddens Road, where the new campus was completed in August 2009. Prior to that, Bishopbriggs Academy had been located at the former Bishopbriggs High School buildings near Bishopbriggs Cross, which were demolished during June 2010.

The council consultation with parents had initially resulted in an agreement that the school would be built on the Bishopbriggs High School site, however this decision was later reversed in favour of the Thomas Muir site in Woodhill, releasing the more valuable BHS site for a proposed supermarket.

== Teaching and facilities ==
The school follows the Scottish Qualification Authorities curriculum, offering from National 3 up to Advanced Highers. The school has over 100 teachers, over 40 non-teaching staff (librarian, office staff, kitchen staff, technicians, facilities etc.) and offers around 30 subjects. The school offers over 35 extracurricular activities including football, rugby, athletics, skiing, badminton, public speaking, choir, theatre, supported study, youth and philanthropy initiative (for seniors) and Duke of Edinburgh awards scheme. The school is split over three levels and has a library with computers for study, three gym halls, a fitness suite, and specialised science, computing, art, design and technology classrooms, study areas, a dining hall, and two athletic fields (one grass, one artificial). As of 2019 the grass pitch has been carved up into two separate sections, one of which has been converted into an artificial grass hockey pitch which is used by the Academy and the neighbouring primary school Thomas Muir.

== Notable alumni ==
- Stuart Bannigan, Partick Thistle and Scotland Under 21 football player.
- Roderick Buchanan, artist
- Akhlaq Choudhury, English High Court judge
- Alan Cook (footballer), Scottish footballer
- Dougie Freedman, Scotland international who notably played for Crystal Palace, Wolves and Nottingham Forest, as well as managing Crystal Palace F.C., Bolton Wanderers and Nottingham Forest F.C.
- Storm Huntley, broadcaster
- Jackie Kay, poet, author, Scottish Makar
- Alastair Kellock, Glasgow Warriors and Scotland national rugby union team captain
- Darren Lyon, current Queen's Park football player, formerly Hamilton Academical, Peterborough United and Queen of the South.
- Amy Macdonald, singer
- Dylan McGeouch, former Celtic, Coventry City, Hibernian, Sunderland, Aberdeen and Scotland footballer
- Jordan Moore, former Dundee United football player.
- Osama Saeed, broadcaster
- Grahame Smith, trade unionist
- Katie Shanahan, British Swimmer, Scottish Commonwealth games Athlete
- Billy Reid, current assistant manager at Brighton & Hove Albion, formerly at Clyde, Hamilton AcademiL Östersund, Swansea City, played for Queen of the South, Clyde, Hamilton Academical and Stirling Albion
- Paul Stallan, award winning architect, best known for designing the 2014 Commonwealth Games Village and his work on the Falkirk Wheel and Scottish Parliament
- Euan Jenner, Location Management on Dinosaur
