= Claudia-Liza Vanderpuije =

English newsreader

Claudia-Liza Vanderpuije is a British former newsreader. From January 2018 until 2024, she was one of the main presenters on 5 News, alongside hosting the Weekend Breakfast Show on Talk. She has also worked for Sky News and hosted the BBC programmes 60 Seconds and Look East.

== Early life ==
Vanderpuije grew up with her Ghanaian mother in West Kensington. She studied history at Queen Mary University College and then completed a master's degree in journalism.

== Broadcasting career ==
Vanderpuije worked at Time FM in Romford, then as an assistant to the news editor at ITN News and at the Press Association; her first presenting job was at Vox Africa. She then worked for BBC Look East. She has also presented 60 Seconds on BBC Three and on BBC News interactive.

At its launch in 2014, she worked for the London Live television channel, where she hosted Headline London at lunchtime.

From January 2018, Vanderpuije presented 5 News Tonight (Monday–Friday), 5 News at 5 (Fridays), and from June to August 2018, guest hosted a few editions of The Wright Stuff between Matthew Wright's departure and Jeremy Vine's arrival. She also covered for Vine during the holidays. In June 2021, she became a weekend presenter on TalkRADIO having previously hosted some shows as a stand-in.

Vanderpuije left Channel 5 News in 2024. She then filed a case against the broadcaster, her co-host Dan Walker and the CEO of ITN, Rachel Corp. Her claims included unfair dismissal, discrimination and harassment on grounds of race and sex, and breach of contract. The hearing started on 20 April 2026 and was due to last five weeks, but, after several days of negotiation and before any evidence was heard, Vanderpuije withdrew her claims with ITN and Channel 5 agreeing to pay her an undisclosed amount of money.

== Personal life ==
Vanderpuije is divorced with two children.

In 2017, Vanderpuije attended an event organised by Star 100, which promotes Ghanaian interests in the UK. She talked about her path to becoming a broadcaster. She told the audience that she has Ghanaian heritage and shared a career strategy she used to net her first job after becoming a mother at age 24.
