= Terry Walton =

Gardening journalist, notable radio contributor

- Born: 1946 (age 79–80); Rhondda, Wales
- Occupations: Gardening Journalist & Broadcaster
- Years active: 2003–present
- Known for: Radio 2 Allotment
- Children: 2

Terry Walton is a Welsh allotment owner, gardening journalist and broadcaster. He is known as the "Radio 2 Gardener" and owner of the "Radio 2 Allotment" in his role as a regular contributor to the Radio 2 Jeremy Vine Show.

== Early life and career ==
Terry Walton was born in the Rhondda in 1946.

He began gardening aged four, helping his father, and got his first allotment plot in 1957 at the age of eleven.

Walton grew up in what he describes as a "typical Rhondda mining house" and has lived in South Wales his whole life.

In the 1960s, with reduced demand for allotments, he took on more plots and tended to ten allotment patches after school. He sold surplus flowers and vegetables grown on his allotments to locals in order to buy his first car.

Walton was educated at Tonypandy Grammar School and went on to attend the Polytechnic of Wales.

Before gaining media attention, Walton worked for a local scientific instruments company and became a company director before his retirement.

Following his own prostate cancer diagnosis Walton became an ambassador for Prostate Cymru and supports a children's cerebral palsy charity called Bobath.

== In The Media ==
Walton came to the attention of Radio 2's Jeremy Vine show after responding to an on-air plea for an allotment the show could adopt following a popular item about allotments on the programme in April 2003.

Walton's first contribution to the show was in July 2003. He became a regular contributor, providing updates and gardening advice live from his allotment in Tonypandy every fortnight.

Walton presents his own podcast; Terry Walton's Plotcast for BBC Wales and BBC Sounds, he has also been a columnist for the South Wales Echo, and a regular contributor to BBC Radio Wales, BBC Radio Bristol, BBC Hereford & Worcester, Super Scrimpers on Channel 4, and ITV's This Morning.

Walton writes a weekly column for Garden News and is a regular contributor to Which?gardening magazine.

Walton has published two books and become a public speaker, and regular contributor to radio, television and newspapers with a popular online following.
