= The Wright Stuff =

British television chat show (2000–2018)

- Genre: Talk show News programme
- Presented by: Matthew Wright
- Country of origin: United Kingdom
- Original language: English

Production
- Camera setup: Multi-camera
- Running time: 120 minutes (inc. adverts)
- Production companies: Anglia Television (2000–02); Granada Television (2000–08); Princess Productions (2008–17); ITN Productions (2018)

Original release
- Network: Channel 5
- Release: 11 September 2000 – 31 August 2018

The Wright Stuff was a British television chat show which was hosted by former tabloid journalist Matthew Wright from 2000 until 2018. It aired on Channel 5 on weekday mornings from 9:15 to 11:15am. The series characterised itself as "Britain's brightest daytime show", which gave "ordinary people the chance to talk and comment on everything from the invasion of Iraq to social, emotional and even sexual issues back at home", as well as featuring "showbiz stars and media commentators". The Wright Stuff was nominated as "Best Daytime Programme" at both the Royal Television Society and the National Television Awards.

The show first aired on 11 September 2000 and was created at Anglia Television who produced it for two years until their takeover by Granada. From 2008 until 2017, it was produced by Princess Productions who also produced The Vanessa Show, Live With Gabby as well as Something For The Weekend and Sunday Brunch, from their studio at Whiteleys Shopping Centre. It was latterly produced by ITN Productions from January 2018 with Wright announcing his departure on 1 May. He left as presenter just over a month later on 14 June after 18 years. Throughout its forthcoming summer, various guest hosts presented the show and it aired for the final time with Anne Diamond hosting on 31 August 2018. The last show ended with a preview of the logo for its successor Jeremy Vine.

On 3 September 2018, Jeremy Vine became the host of the current daily current affairs show Jeremy Vine, which continues to be produced by ITN Productions.

== Studio and production ==
The programme was launched from the Anglia television studios in Norwich. After the end of the contract with Granada, the programme was later broadcast from MTV Studios in Camden, North London before moving to Princess Production's studios on the third floor of Whiteley's Shopping Centre, Bayswater, London. From January to August 2018, the programme broadcast from ITN's central London HQ.

== Main host and stand-ins ==
Matthew Wright hosted the show from when it began in 2000 until he left in 2018. When he went on holiday or was ill, others filled in for him. Many of the regular panel members hosted the show in its early stages such as James O'Brien, Janet Ellis, Kate Silverton, Henry Bonsu, Anne Diamond, Vanessa Feltz, Lowri Turner, Matt Allwright, Kaye Adams, Nihal Arthenayke, Hardeep Singh Kohli, Christopher Biggins and Andrew Castle. Occasionally new guest hosts were drafted in, Simon Hardeman, Jane Moore, Anneka Rice, Piers Morgan, Simon Mayo, Richard Bacon, Stephen Nolan, Coleen Nolan, Fiona Phillips, Donal MacIntyre, Penny Smith and Claudia-Liza Vanderpuije have hosted.

Wright entered I'm a Celebrity...Get Me Out Of Here in November 2013, leaving Richard Madeley to host the show for a month. Madeley continued to guest host regularly until January 2017. In August 2017 Trisha Goddard, Nina Wadia and Anne Diamond guest hosted five episodes each.

Presenters
| Name | Title | Duration |
|---|---|---|
| Matthew Wright | Main Presenter | 2000–2018 |
| Richard Madeley | Deputy Presenter | 2012–2017 |
| Trisha Goddard | Stand-In Presenter | 2017 |
| Penny Smith | Stand-In Presenter | 2012, 2016–2018 |
| Anne Diamond | Stand-In Presenter | 2013–2018 |
| Matt Barbet | Stand-In Presenter | 2014–2018 |
| Claudia-Liza Vanderpuije | Stand-In Presenter | 2018 |

== Live with... ==
Launched in June 2011 as The Wright Stuff Extra with Gabby Logan and then as Live With Gabby Logan, Live With... was a daytime magazine format seeking to build on the success of the main discussion show. It contained a mix of topical discussion, DIY, consumer items, relationship issues and medical matters.

It was initially presented by former BBC Radio 5 Live presenter, Gabby Logan and aired from 11:10 am to 12:10 pm immediately after The Wright Stuff. From 26 September 2011, the show was rebranded as Live with Gabby with a new theme tune and titles. On 5 April 2012, the producers tweeted to announce that Logan was leaving Channel 5 because of her commitments to host the 2012 Olympics. The show aired its final edition with Logan as host on 6 April 2012.

Its run continued on 10 April as Live with..., with a variety of guest hosts, including Kaye Adams, former TVS Coast To Coast anchor Fern Britton, Atomic Kitten member Jenny Frost and Myleene Klass. The show ended in mid-2012 after it fulfilled the episodes booked by Channel 5.

== Co-presenters ==
=== "Babe in the Booth" ===
It had been a feature of the show that there was a female co-host (originally a telephone operator) in a booth separated from the main presenter and guest area. This was because one of the original creators, a producer at Anglia television was a big fan of the American sitcom Frasier, and the role of Frasier's producer Roz Doyle. From the redesign of the set in 2010 until the show ended in 2018, the booth was gone and the co-host sat in the audience area. The longest serving female co-host from 2015 until 2018 was Storm Huntley who continued her role in the shows replacement Jeremy Vine.

The following hosts have fulfilled this role earlier in the show's tenure:

- Hester Grainger
- Becky Jago
- Stef Alexander
- Beth Palmer – now works as a continuity announcer on Channel 4
- Sarah Hogan
- Korin Nolan – performed the task for four years between 2004 and 2008,
- Amie Morris – found as a replacement for Phina Oruche who filled in for a week after Korin Nolan left
- Kirsty Duffy – Kirsty left to have a baby
- Seema Pathan – Mid-2014–2017
- Georgie Barrett - stand-in, now presents on The Gadget Show
- Storm Huntley – May 2015 – 2018
- Rezzy Ghadjar (cover) – January 2015 – 2018

=== "Man with the Mic" ===
A male presenter sat in the audience taking views on the various topics from them. He needed to be across the news stories of the day and co-ordinate live debate between the studio audience, celebrity panellists and viewers at home. His principal role was audience researcher, booker and wrangler, meeting the audience in the morning, preparing them for the show and firing a lively debate amongst them during commercial breaks. The first "Man with the Mic" was Matt Rudge who left to pursue a successful career as a writer and stand-up comic. The second longest-running "Man with the Mic" was Seyi Rhodes, who worked on the show for just over two years. He took over from Rudge in 2003. Rhodes now works as a Foreign Affairs Reporter on the Channel 4 documentary series Unreported World. He was named as one of Channel 4's "next generation of presenting voices" in 2008. Amol Rajan took over from Rhodes, but in turn left to join The Independent newspaper, later becoming its editor in 2013. Eric Johnson took over in September 2007 and held the position the longest. He is now a presenter on Sky News. The "Man with the Mic" until the end of 2017 was Alex Davoodi.

== Panellists ==
Originally, the series had just 2 regular panelists joining Wright, who were journalists James O'Brien and Kate Silverton, and the series featured a studio audience but did not feature a special guest. O'Brien appeared until 2002 and Silverton appeared until 2005 but less frequently as previously. From 2002 two new panellists every week and a third panelist who would be a special guest for the day. There was always a male and female panel member as well the special guest. As of 2018 the panellists rotated daily, as opposed to a weekly rotation.

Regular panel members have included television presenters, journalists, comedians, politicians, actors, singers, entertainers and reality television stars. These have included:

- Angela Rippon (2002–2018)
- Dominic Holland (2002–2018)
- David Bull (2002–2018)
- Janet Ellis (2002–2018)
- Lowri Turner (2002–2018)
- Lauren Booth (2003–2018)
- Ed Vaizey (2003–2018)
- Anne Diamond (2003–2018)
- Daisy McAndrew (2004–2018)
- Yasmin Alibhai-Brown (2004–2018)
- Nihal Arthanayake (2005–2018)
- Melinda Messenger (2005–2018)
- Carole Malone (2006–2018)
- Mica Paris (2007–2018)
- Amanda Lamb (2007–2018)
- Anton Du Beke (2008–2018)
- Christopher Biggins (2008–2018)
- Mark Little (Australian actor) (2009–2018)
- Jamelia (2011–2018)
- Scott Capurro (2011–18)
- Shazia Mirza (2011–18)
- Penny Smith (2012–2018)
- Alexis Conran (2012–2018)
- Christine Hamilton (2012–2018)
- Nadine Dorries (2013–2018)
- John Barnes (footballer) (2014–2018)
- Dawn Harper (2016–2018)
- Bobby Friction (2016–2018)
- Jemma Forte (2017–2018)
- Simon Jordan (2017–18)
- Collabro's Jamie Lambert (2017–18)
- Amanda Prowse (2017–18)
- Heidi Allen (2018)
- Tracy Brabin (2018)
- Susie Boniface (2018)
- Richard Coles (2018)
- Martin Daubney (2018)
- Caroline Flint (2018)
- Anne Hegerty (2018)
- Jon Holmes (2018)
- Ashley James (2018)
- Stanley Johnson (writer) (2018)
- Claire King (2018)
- Paris Lees (2018)
- Aasmah Mir (2018)
- Linda Nolan (2018)
- Kevin O'Sullivan (journalist) (2018)
- Alex Polizzi (2018)
- Eve Pollard (2018)
- Wes Streeting (2018)
- Claire Sweeney (2018)
- Anna Williamson (2018)
- Courtney Act (2018)
- Quentin Willson (2000–2018)

Television critic Ian Hyland from the News of the World used to appear on the show every Monday with a review of the week's television, taking the space of the guest panellist in the final segment of the show. He left when the show was extended to 90 minutes. Hyland returned in April 2010 in a Friday slot but was replaced by Sunday Mirror columnist Kevin O'Sullivan later that year. When O'Sullivan was unavailable, the Daily Star's Mike Ward stepped in.

The special guest was often on the show to promote something, like a new film, show or book. Guests on the show have included Morgan Spurlock, Michael Barrymore, Jane Asher, Terry Waite, Sarah Brightman, Martin Fry and Ian Smith (the week that Neighbours moved to Five).

== Format ==
The format was based upon the more traditional radio phone-in, featuring well-known guests discussing topical issues, and encouraging contributions from the studio and television audiences, text messages, e-mails and a phone vote. When the show was first broadcast it was 1 hour but it was then extended to 90 minutes. On 10 January 2011, an extended format lasting 1 hour 45 minutes was launched. Until 2018, the show was 2 hours long, starting at 9:15 am and ending at 11:15 am, and was transmitted as seven parts:

1. The show began with Wright standing and giving a brief introduction to the show. After the titles, Matthew introduced the panel and has a chat with the day's special guest. This segment usually lasted 15 minutes.
2. After an advert break, the panel and Wright discussed the "biggest" news story of the day. Viewers comments were not usually given during this segment. This segment usually lasted 10–15 minutes.
3. When the show returned from its second advert break, the discussion from part 2 continued but this time the panel heard the opinions of callers to the show. This segment usually lasted 5–10 minutes.
4. When the show returned from its third advert break, the panel talked through the day's papers. The special guest usually had four stories, with the remaining two panellists giving three stories. Most of the news came from the papers, although on occasion breaking news was told from the internet. This segment usually lasted 30 minutes.
5. This part of the show was the second of the four talking points. Panel discussed first, then callers and audience opinions were heard. This segment usually lasted 10 minutes.
6. This segment featured the third viewer discussion. This tended to be shorter and lasted around 5 minutes.
7. This segment started with emails and tweets being read out by Storm (or whoever was standing in as the co-host), then continued with the fourth and final viewer discussion. On Fridays, this part of the show was dedicated solely to a television review with critic Kevin O'Sullivan or another television critic in his absence.

== Commercial break question ==
A feature of the programme was a "multiple choice" or "true or false" quiz question posed before the commercial break, usually based on the next discussion topic. The answer was provided at the start of the next segment. This feature has been carried over into Jeremy Vine.

== 10th birthday ==
The programme celebrated its 10th birthday on 9 September 2010 with a special hour-long evening edition broadcast at 8 pm on Channel 5.

== Theme tune ==
The programme had three main theme tunes, the first was similar to the original theme for the BBC's Saturday Kitchen Live. The second had been modified on several occasions from its launch until the end of 2010. From January 2011 until the show's end in 2018, an upbeat theme tune in a retro jazzy 1960s style was used and has been carried over into Jeremy Vine.

== Controversies ==
In 2002, the show was at the centre of a media scandal when Wright "accidentally" named John Leslie on air as the anonymous rapist mentioned in Ulrika Jonsson's autobiography. Since this time, Wright has been notably reticent about discussing issues that involve "unnamed" celebrities, such as the 2006 "football player and mobile phone" scandal – often remarking "given my previous record on certain issues, I feel more than a little nervous discussing this".

In May 2008, the show came under scrutiny from animal rights group PETA. The group claimed that the fishbowl containing Wright Stuff fish, Brad and Jen, was too small. On 27 May show, Wright told viewers that the show's resident vet would look into the matter.

On 13 August 2008, Asian entrepreneur James Caan appeared on the programme and mocked Prince Charles wearing a kilt. Caan held up a copy of a UK daily newspaper, which showed the Prince wearing a kilt, and remarked that people should not take him too seriously because he was wearing a "skirt". He apologised later in the show, saying he had not meant to cause offence. Caan also offered to return to the show in future wearing a kilt, though he did not fulfil this promise.

On 4 October 2011, a day after the American Amanda Knox was acquitted of the murder of British student Meredith Kercher, Wright sparked criticism by opening a discussion on whether viewers would consider "going back to Knox's room after meeting her in a bar". A spokesperson for the show said the debate – which was based on a long-standing media caricature of Knox as "Foxy Knoxy" – had been "handled extremely sensitively". Wright apologised a day later, saying he had "framed the debate in the wrong way".

On 6 December 2011, Wright joked about the murder on 5 December of Liam Aitchison, a 16-year-old boy, on the Scottish Isle of Lewis. During the show he put on a mock Scottish accent and said "there's been another murder", copying a phrase from detective show Taggart. He apologised for this but said to those organising a complaint to Ofcom that they should "grow up".

On 10 May 2012, it was reported the show was being investigated by Ofcom over a survey on 26 April edition that asked viewers what the most offensive word is to describe someone with learning difficulties.

The show received many prank calls from the public only to make a highly controversial comment by using inappropriate language on air. This often resulted in a significant overreaction from Wright, whose hilariously hysterical reactions are thought to prompt more people to make prank calls on the show. Callers often engaged with the discussion initially to gain credibility, then making inappropriate comments. They often shouted multiple expletives or would make a personal attack on a person who the caller wanted to expose on live national television, for example an ex-partner. It is thought that a handful of individuals were persistent prank callers and appeared on the live phone ins on many occasions without being recognised.

On 8 April 2015, the show received a prank call. While discussing a new play based on Jimmy Savile, a caller rang in on the pretence of being outraged by such a production, only to start singing the theme song for the wrestling tag team American Males, most famous for their work in American promotion World Championship Wrestling in the 1990s. This was presumably done on the tenuous link that Savile himself had started out as a wrestler.

== Popular culture references ==
In 2003, Wright appeared in the video for "Proper Crimbo" the Christmas single released from the team behind Bo' Selecta. In a spoof of the Michael Jackson video for "Thriller". In the video Wright took the place of the girl in the car, while instead of morphing into a wolf, the Michael Jackson character morphed into John Leslie who "wanted a word" with Matthew Wright, a reference to Wright revealing the John Leslie scandal by mistake on his show.

In 2006, The Wright Stuff featured in the third episode of the second series of Extras. Both Wright and Lowri Turner were discussing the fictional incidents of the characters that had appeared in the press. Wright has since revealed on his show that he receives a small repeat fee every time the episode is shown. The show was also referred to in the BBC Three series Drop Dead Gorgeous, the character of Murray Priestman saying he liked to start his day by watching it.
