= Down on the Farm (2015 TV series) =

- Genre: Children's
- Created by: CBeebies
- Presented by: JB Gill; Storm Huntley
- Country of origin: United Kingdom
- Original language: English
- No. of series: 9
- No. of episodes: 50

Production
- Executive producer: Various
- Producer: BBC
- Editor: Various
- Camera setup: Multi-camera
- Running time: 28 minutes (2015–2019); 35 minutes (2020–2023)
- Production company: BBC Children's Productions

Original release
- Network: CBeebies
- Release: 2015 – 2023

Down on the Farm is a British television series that was broadcast on CBeebies for 9 series from 2015 to 2023. It was hosted by JB Gill and Storm Huntley.
