= Rachel Schofield =

English journalist

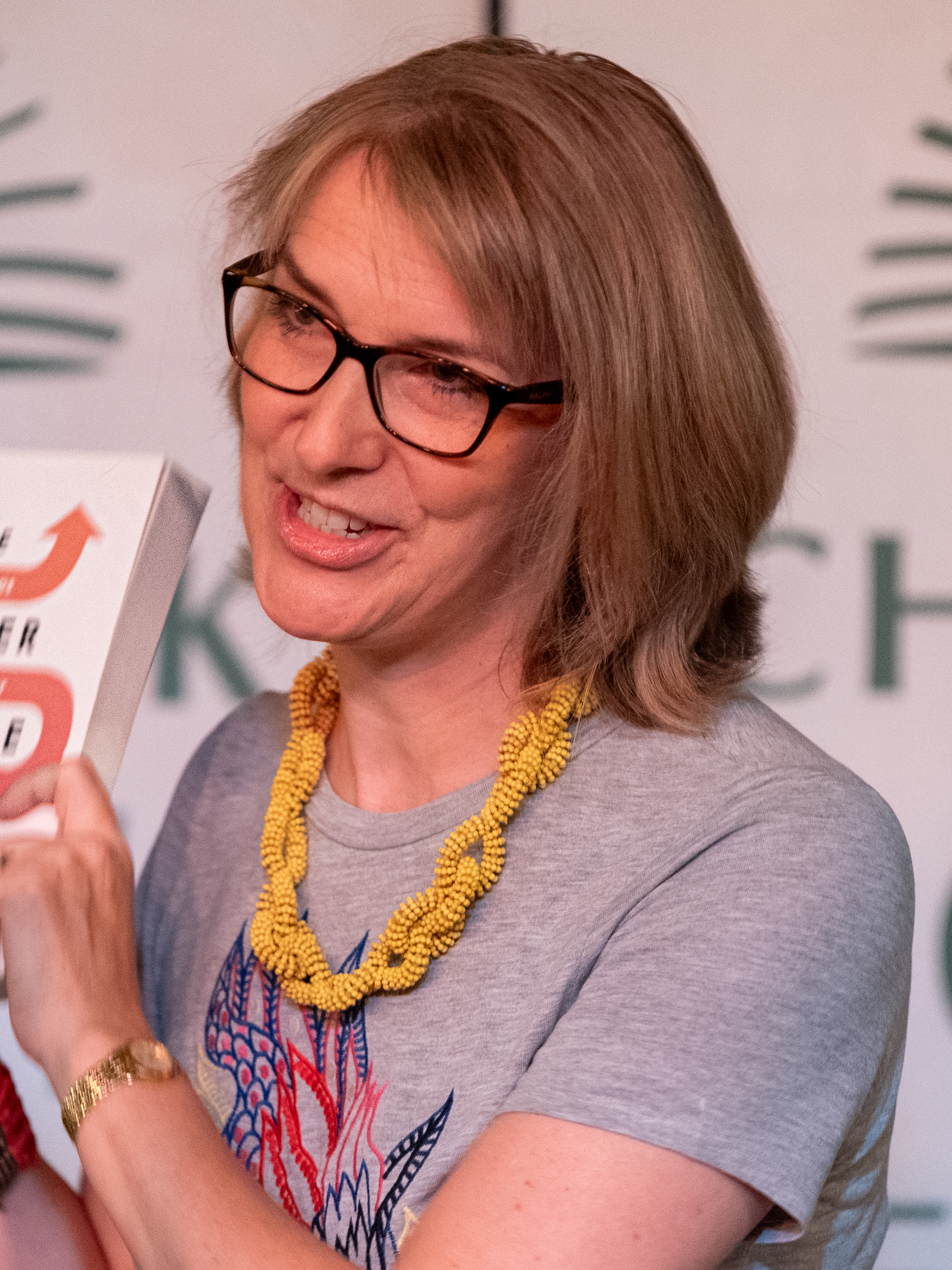
- Schofield at the 2023 Chiswick Book Festival
- Born: Rachel Katherine Schofield; 12 February 1976 (age 50); Winchester, Hampshire, England
- Education: St Margaret's School, Exeter
- Alma mater: Durham University
- Occupation: Journalist
- Years active: 1999–present
- Employer: BBC
- Television: BBC News
- Spouse: Jeremy Vine (m. 2002)
- Children: 2
- Relatives: Tim Vine (brother-in-law)

Rachel Katherine Schofield (born 12 February 1976 in Winchester, Hampshire) is an English career coach and former journalist and news presenter.

== Education ==
Schofield grew up in Tipton St John, Devon, and was educated at St Margaret's School, Exeter, an independent school for girls.

She obtained a first class degree in Modern European Languages (French, German and Italian) at Durham University (St John's College), where she joined Purple FM. She was at Durham from 1994–98, spending a year in Vienna. From 1998–99, she did a Broadcast Journalism course at the London College of Printing (now called the London College of Communication).

== Radio and television career ==
She started her career at the BBC on BBC Radio Newcastle in 1999 and also reported for BBC Look North. She then moved to be a reporter for BBC Radio 4 before joining BBC News. Schofield resigned from her position in September 2012, although has returned on a freelance basis.

At the beginning of September 2020, she co-hosted the Jeremy Vine show for one week, standing in for the regular show co-host Storm Huntley.

== Personal life ==
She met the then Newsnight reporter Jeremy Vine in the run-up to the 2001 general election when he was touring Britain in a VW camper van. The couple married on 14 September 2002 in Tipton St John, Devon. They live in Chiswick, west London, and have two daughters, born in 2004 and 2006.
