= Lowri Turner =

British television presenter

- Born: London, UK
- Occupation: Nutritional therapist

Lowri Gwyneth Turner is a British former fashion journalist and television presenter, who works as a private nutritional therapist and clinical hypnotherapist.

== Early life ==
Turner was born in 1964 in London, to Welsh parents Mervyn and Shirley Turner. She received her formal education at the Grey Coat Hospital School, and Camden School for Girls.

== Journalism career ==
Turner began her career as a fashion journalist for The Observer in the late 1980s, and in the 1990s she became fashion editor at the Evening Standard. During the 1990s and 2000s she worked as a freelance journalist writing for a wide variety of newspaper titles with op-ed copy. In 2006, she was criticised in the Welsh Assembly, where she was accused of homophobia for an article that was published in her Western Mail column entitled "However much I love my gay friends, I don't want them running the country".

== Television career ==
Turner's television career started on GMTV in 1993. She was a regular panellist on the Channel 5 series The Wright Stuff.

She was a contributor to Doctor Who: Thirty Years in the TARDIS, a documentary celebration of the 30th anniversary of Doctor Who in 1993, in which she discussed the Edwardian feel to the Doctor's costumes and her fondness for Jon Pertwee's portrayal of the character.

She has made appearances as a celebrity panelist on BBC2's quiz show Going, Going, Gone, and has presented the shows Looking Good, Shopping City, Housecall, Would Like to Meet and DIY SOS.

In 2004, Turner took part in the reality TV show Celebrity Fit Club.

In 2006, she made a cameo appearance in the third episode of the second series of Extras.

== Health career ==
Turner has a Foundation Degree in Nutritional Therapy from the University of Bedfordshire and a Diploma in Clinical Hypnosis from the Institute of Clinical Hypnosis. She works as a lifestyle advisor, hypnotherapist and nutritionist specialising in health and weight loss.

== Personal life ==
Turner has been married twice and has three children, two with her first husband Paul Connew, and one daughter with second husband, Nicol Batra, an Indian physician, from whom she is also divorced.
