= Falkirk Wheel =

Rotating boat lift in Scotland

Coordinates: 56°0′1″N 3°50′30″W

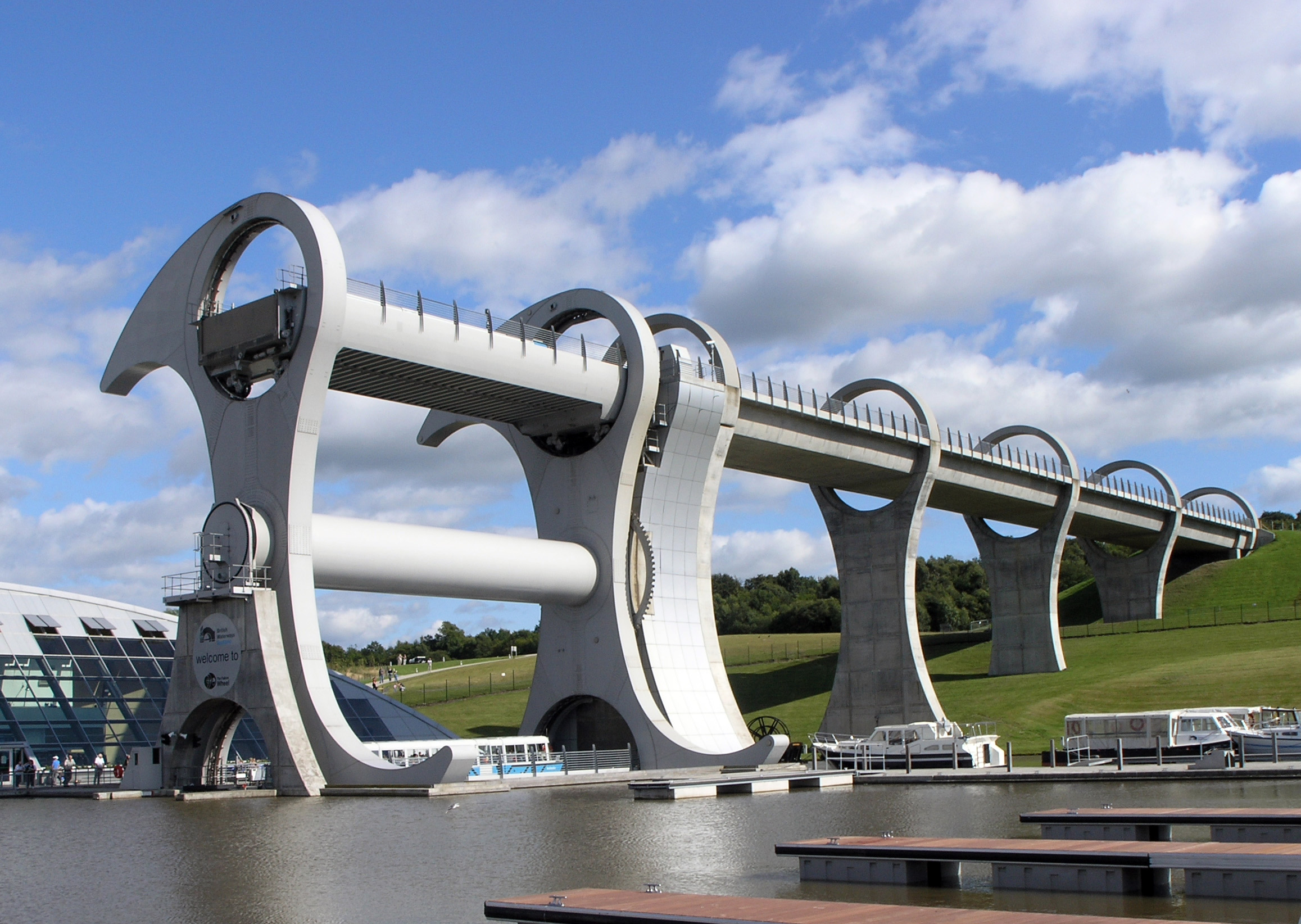
The Falkirk Wheel

A timelapse of the wheel rotation. This video covers a time period of 10 minutes

A timelapse from inside a boat

The Falkirk Wheel (Scottish Gaelic: Cuibhle na h-Eaglaise Brice) is a rotating boat lift in Tamfourhill, Falkirk, in central Scotland, connecting the Forth and Clyde Canal with the Union Canal. It opened in 2002 as part of the Millennium Link project, reconnecting the two canals for the first time since the 1930s.

The plan to regenerate central Scotland's canals and reconnect Glasgow with Edinburgh was led by British Waterways with support and funding from seven local authorities, the Scottish Enterprise Network, the European Regional Development Fund, and the Millennium Commission. Planners decided early to create a dramatic 21st-century landmark structure to reconnect the canals, rather than simply recreating the historic lock flight.

The wheel raises boats by 24 metres (79 ft), but the Union Canal is still 11 metres (36 ft) higher than the aqueduct which meets the wheel. Boats must also pass through a pair of locks between the top of the wheel and the Union Canal. The Falkirk Wheel is the only rotating boat lift of its kind in the world, and one of two working boat lifts in the United Kingdom, the other being the Anderton Boat Lift.

== History ==
=== Pre-1933 link ===
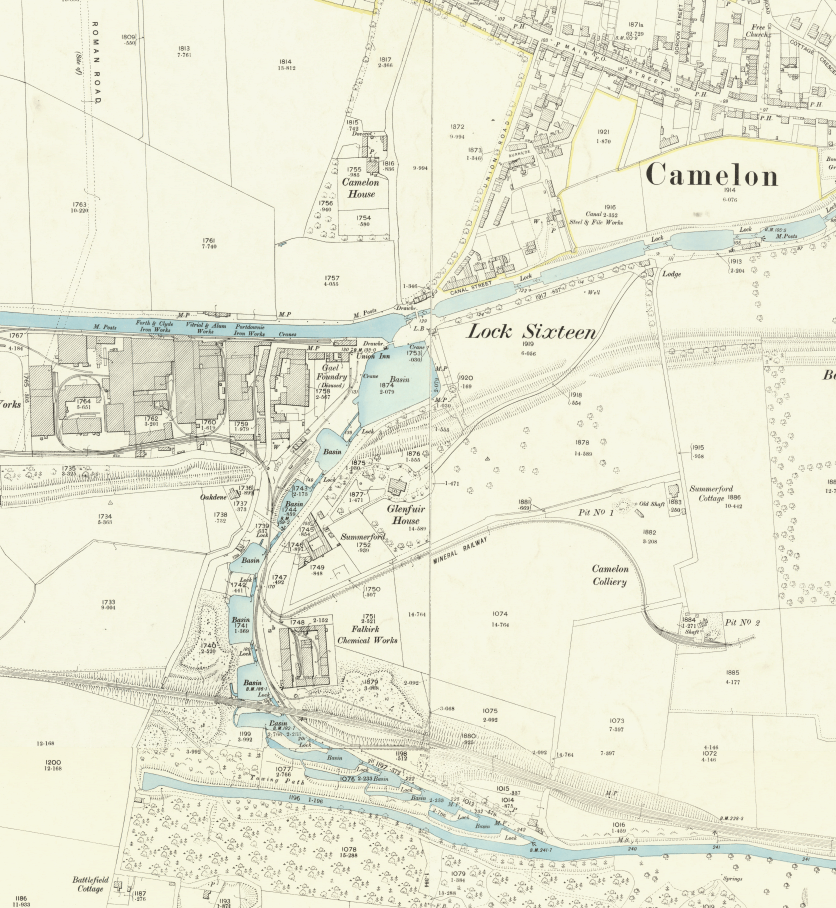
Ordnance Survey map of the lock flight at Falkirk

The two canals served by the wheel were previously connected by a series of 11 locks. With a 35-metre (115 ft) difference in height, it required 3,500 tonnes (3,400 long tons; 3,900 short tons) of water per run and took most of a day to pass through the flight.

By the 1930s these locks had fallen into disuse, and were dismantled in 1933. The Forth and Clyde Canal closed at the end of 1962, and by the mid-1970s the Union Canal was filled in at both ends, rendered impassable by culverts in two places and run in pipes under a housing estate. The British Waterways Board (BWB) came into existence on 1 January 1963, the day the Forth and Clyde Canal was closed, with the objective of finding a broad strategy for the future of canals in the United Kingdom.

In 1976, the BWB decided after a meeting with local councils that the Forth and Clyde Canal, fragmented by various developments, was to have its remaining navigability preserved by building new bridges with sufficient headroom for boats and continuing to maintain the existing locks. Restoration of sea-to-sea navigation was deemed too expensive at the time, but there were to be no further restrictions on its use. A 1979 survey report documented 69 obstructions to navigation, and sought the opinions of twenty interested parties to present the Forth and Clyde Local (Subject) Plan in 1980.

=== Proposal ===
The Lotteries Act 1993 resulted in the creation of the Millennium Commission to disseminate funds raised by the sale of lottery tickets for selected "good causes". In 1996, when sufficient funds had been accumulated, the Commission invited applications to "do anything they thought desirable ... to support worthwhile causes which would mark the year 2000 and the start of the new millennium." The conditions were that the Commission would fund no more than half of the project, with the remaining balance being covered by project backers.

The BWB had made an earlier plan for the reopening of the canal link, which comprehensively covered the necessary work. In 1994, the BWB announced its plan to bid for funding, which was submitted in 1995 on behalf of the Millennium Link Partnership. The plans called for the canals to be opened to their original operating dimensions, with 3 metres (9.8 ft) of headroom above the water. The whole project had a budget of £78 million.

On 14 February 1997, the Commission announced it would support the Link with £32 million of funding, 42% of the project cost. The Wheel and its associated basin was priced at £17 million, more than a fifth of the total budget. Another £46 million had to be raised in the next two years before construction could commence, with contributions from BWB, seven local councils, Scottish Enterprise, and private donations being augmented by £8.6 million from the European Regional Development Fund.

=== Design ===
The Morrison–Bachy Soletanche Joint Venture Team submitted their original design, which resembled a Ferris wheel with four gondolas, in 1999. It was agreed by all parties that the design was functional, but not the showpiece the BWB were looking for. After being asked to reconsider, a 20-strong team of architects and engineers was assembled by British Waterways. Under the leadership of Tony Kettle from architects RMJM, the initial concepts and images were created with the mechanical concepts proposed by the design team from Butterley and M G Bennetts. This was an intense period of work, with the final design concept completed in a three-week period during the summer of 1999. The final design was a co-operative effort between the British Waterways Board, engineering consultants Arup, Butterley Engineering and RMJM.

Diagrams of gear systems that had been proposed in the very first concepts were modelled by Kettle using his eight year-old daughter's Lego. Drawings and artist impressions were shown to clients and funders. The visitor centre was designed by another RMJM architect, Paul Stallan.

Inspirations for the design include a double-headed Celtic axe (a bearded axe), the propeller of a ship and the ribcage of a whale. Kettle described the Wheel as "a beautiful, organic flowing thing, like the spine of a fish," and the Royal Fine Art Commission for Scotland described it as "a form of contemporary sculpture."

Models and renderings of the Falkirk Wheel were displayed in a 2012 exhibition at the Victoria and Albert Museum in London. Since 2007, the Falkirk Wheel has been featured on the obverse of the new series of £50 notes issued by the Bank of Scotland. The series of notes commemorates Scottish engineering achievements with illustrations of bridges in Scotland such as the Glenfinnan Viaduct and the Forth Bridge.

=== Construction ===
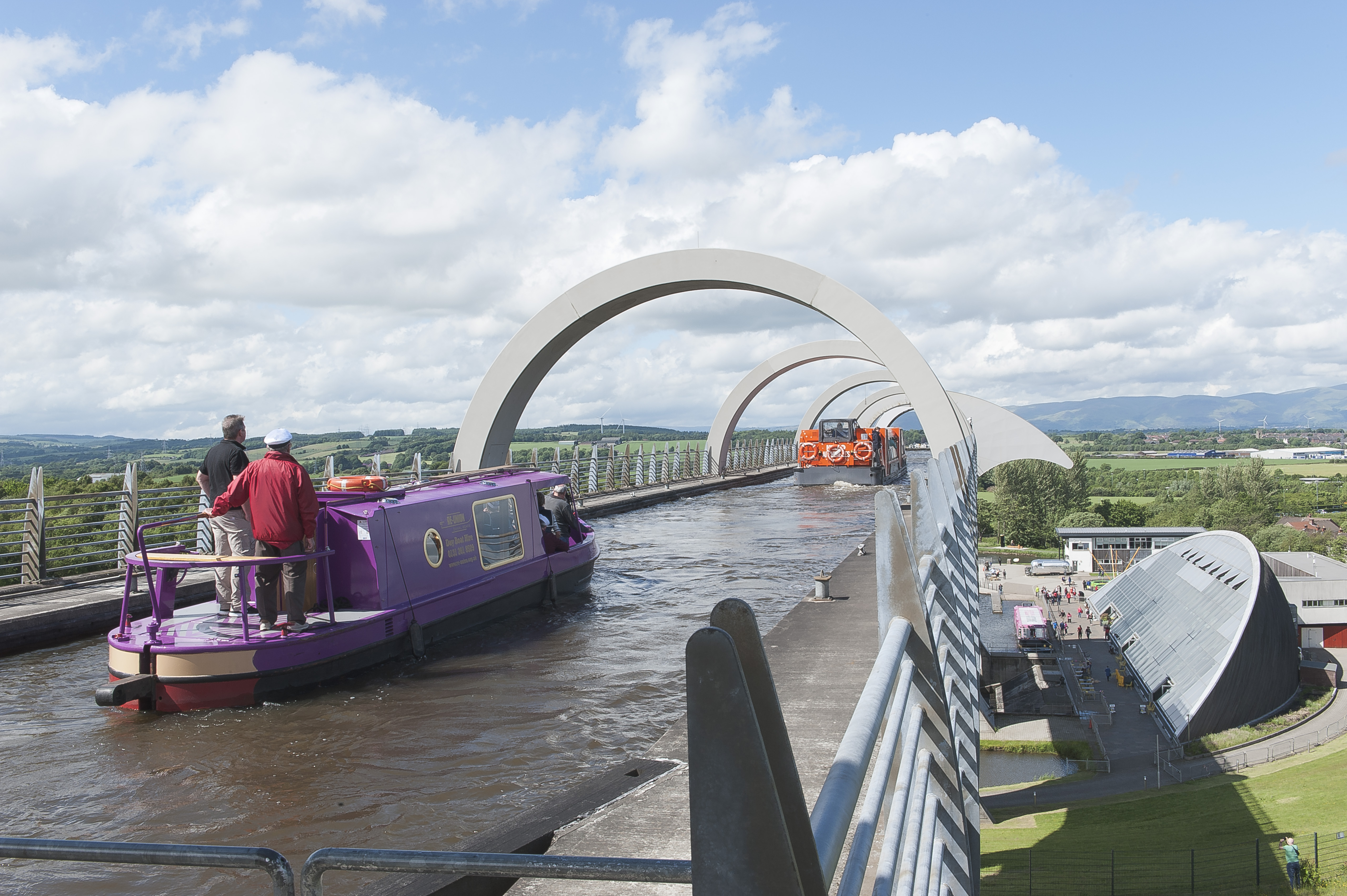
View of the aqueduct and top of the wheel

In March 1999 Donald Dewar, the Secretary of State for Scotland, cut the first sod of turf to begin work at lock 31 on the Forth and Clyde Canal. Over 1000 people were employed in the construction of the wheel, which was designed to last for at least 120 years.

The wheel was fully constructed and assembled at the Butterley Engineering plant in Ripley, Derbyshire. The structure was then dismantled in the summer of 2001, and transported on 35 lorry loads to Falkirk, before being reassembled into five sections on the ground and lifted into place. Construction of the canal required 250,000 m^{3} (8,800,000 cu ft) of excavation, a 160 m (520 ft) canal tunnel of 8 m (26 ft) diameter, aqueducts of 20 m (66 ft) and 120 m (390 ft), three sets of locks and a number of bridges, as well as 600 m (2,000 ft) of access roads. The 180 m (590 ft) Rough Castle Tunnel was driven in three stages, with the two upper quarters being drilled with a standard excavator before the lower half was dug using a modified road planer in 100 mm (4 in) layers. This technique was 15% cheaper and reduced the build time of the tunnel by two weeks.

=== Technical considerations ===
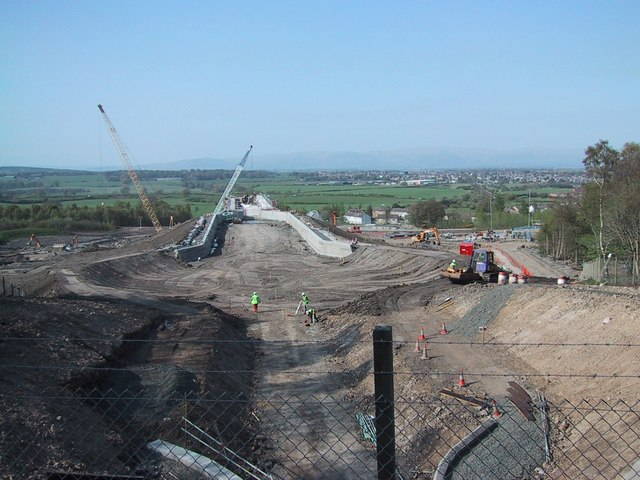
The construction of the basin

The ground on which the wheel is built was previously used as an open cast fire clay mine, a coal mine, and a tar works, resulting in contamination of the canal with tar and mercury. Twenty metres (66 ft) of loosely packed backfill from the mining operations containing large sandstone boulders was not considered adequately solid foundation for the size of the structure, so deep foundations with thirty 22 m (72 ft) concrete piles socketed onto the bedrock were used.

Due to the changing load as the wheel rotates in alternating directions, some sections experience total stress reversals. In order to avoid fatigue that could lead to cracks, sections were bolted rather than welded, using over 14,000 bolts and 45,000 bolt holes.

The aqueduct, engineered by Arup, was originally described as "unbuildable", but was eventually realised using 40 mm (1.6 in) rebar. The original plans also showed the canal being built straight through the Antonine Wall, but this was changed after a petition in favour of two locks and a tunnel under the wall.

=== Opening ceremony ===
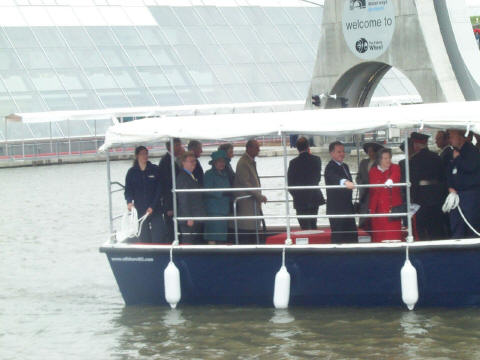
Members of the Royal Family at the opening ceremony

On 24 May 2002, Queen Elizabeth II opened the Falkirk Wheel as part of her Golden Jubilee celebrations. The opening was delayed a month due to flooding caused by vandals who forced open the wheel's gates. The damage, which cost £350,000 to repair, resulted in the dry well being flooded, damaging electrical and hydraulic equipment.

== Operation ==
=== Structure ===
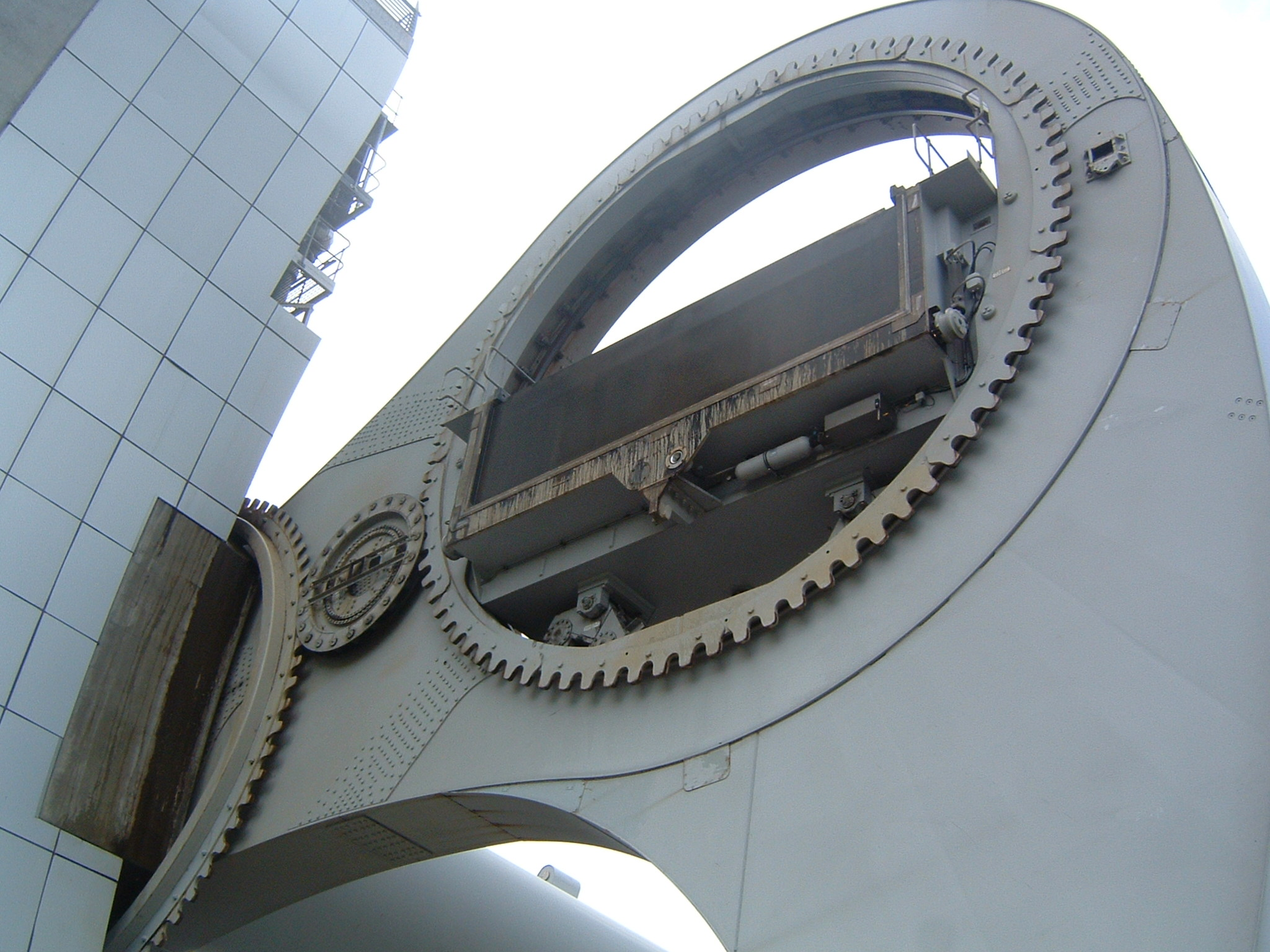
The ring gears

The wheel has an overall diameter of 35 m (115 ft) and consists of two opposing arms extending 15 m (49 ft) beyond the central axle and taking the shape of a Celtic-inspired double-headed axe. Two sets of these axe-shaped arms are connected to a 3.8 m (12 ft) diameter central axle of length 28 m (92 ft). Two diametrically opposed water-filled caissons, each with a capacity of 250,000 litres (55,000 imp gal; 66,000 US gal), are fitted between the ends of the arms.

The caissons, or gondolas, always carry a combined weight of 500 tonnes (490 long tons; 550 short tons) of water and boats, with the gondolas themselves each weighing 50 tonnes (49 long tons; 55 short tons). Care is taken to maintain the water levels on each side, thus balancing the weight on each arm. According to Archimedes' principle, floating objects displace their own weight in water, so when the boat enters, the amount of water leaving the caisson weighs exactly the same as the boat. Site-wide computer control system maintain the water levels on each side to within a difference of 37 mm (1.5 in) with water level sensors, automated sluices and pumps. It takes 22.5 kilowatts (30.2 hp) to power ten hydraulic motors, which consume 1.5 kilowatt-hours (5,100 BTU) per half-turn, roughly the same as boiling eight kettles of water.

Each of the two caissons is 6.5 metres (21 ft) wide and 21.3 metres (70 ft) long. Each can hold up to four 20-metre-long (66 ft) canal boats. The wheel raises or lowers boats a total of 24 metres (79 ft), and two subsequent locks raise or lower boats another 11 metres (36 ft).

=== Watertight doors ===
Watertight doors at each end match doors located on the upper structure and lower dock pit. Due to space concerns, where a normal hinged door would dramatically reduce the useful length of the caisson, vertically rising hinged doors were chosen. The doors are raised from a recess in the base of the caisson and powered by a hydraulic lance when docked.

After the wheel arms are moved into the vertical position, the locking mechanisms are activated. These include securing pins that are protruded into the caisson bases, and hydraulic clamps that are raised to hold the caissons in place. Additionally, a set of larger securing pins at the lower structure is used to hold the wheel. Although the door of the upper caisson and the door that holds the water at the upper aqueduct are aligned, there is a gap between them. The upper aqueduct door has a U-shape watertight frame which can be extended to push against the caisson door to seal the gap. The water is pumped into the gap to fill to the water level. Once the water in the gap is equalized, the door on the aqueduct side is lowered, followed by the door on the caisson side, allowing the boat to pass. On the reverse direction, when the boat is in the caisson, the caisson door is raised, followed by the upper aqueduct door. The water is pumped out of the gap. Then the U-shape watertight seal is recessed back closer to the upper aqueduct door. Finally, the locking mechanisms are removed before the wheel is turned. This process is similar for the door at the lower canal basin as well.

Doors, locking mechanisms, and seals

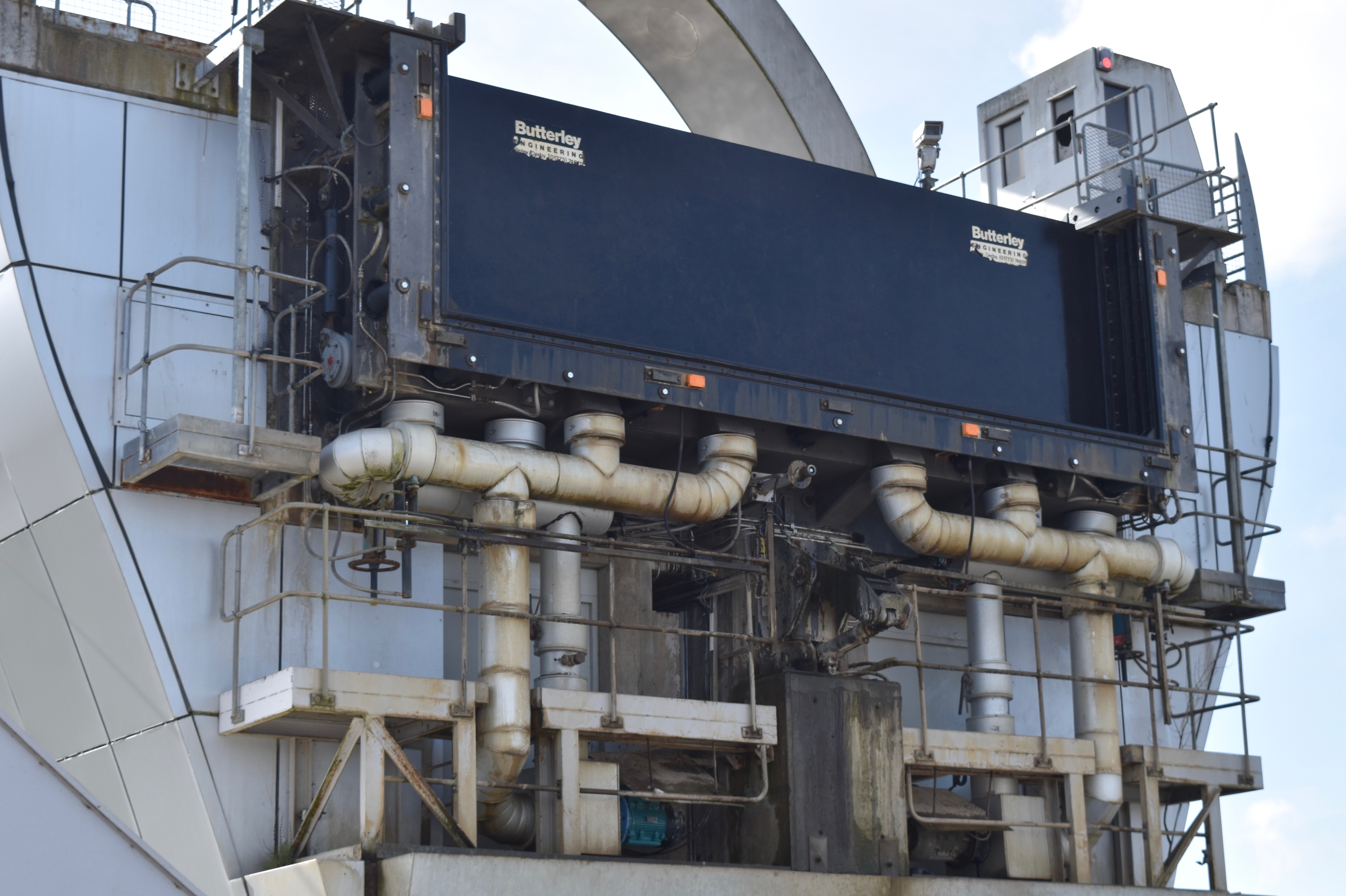
Upper aqueduct door with U-shape seal and pumping system

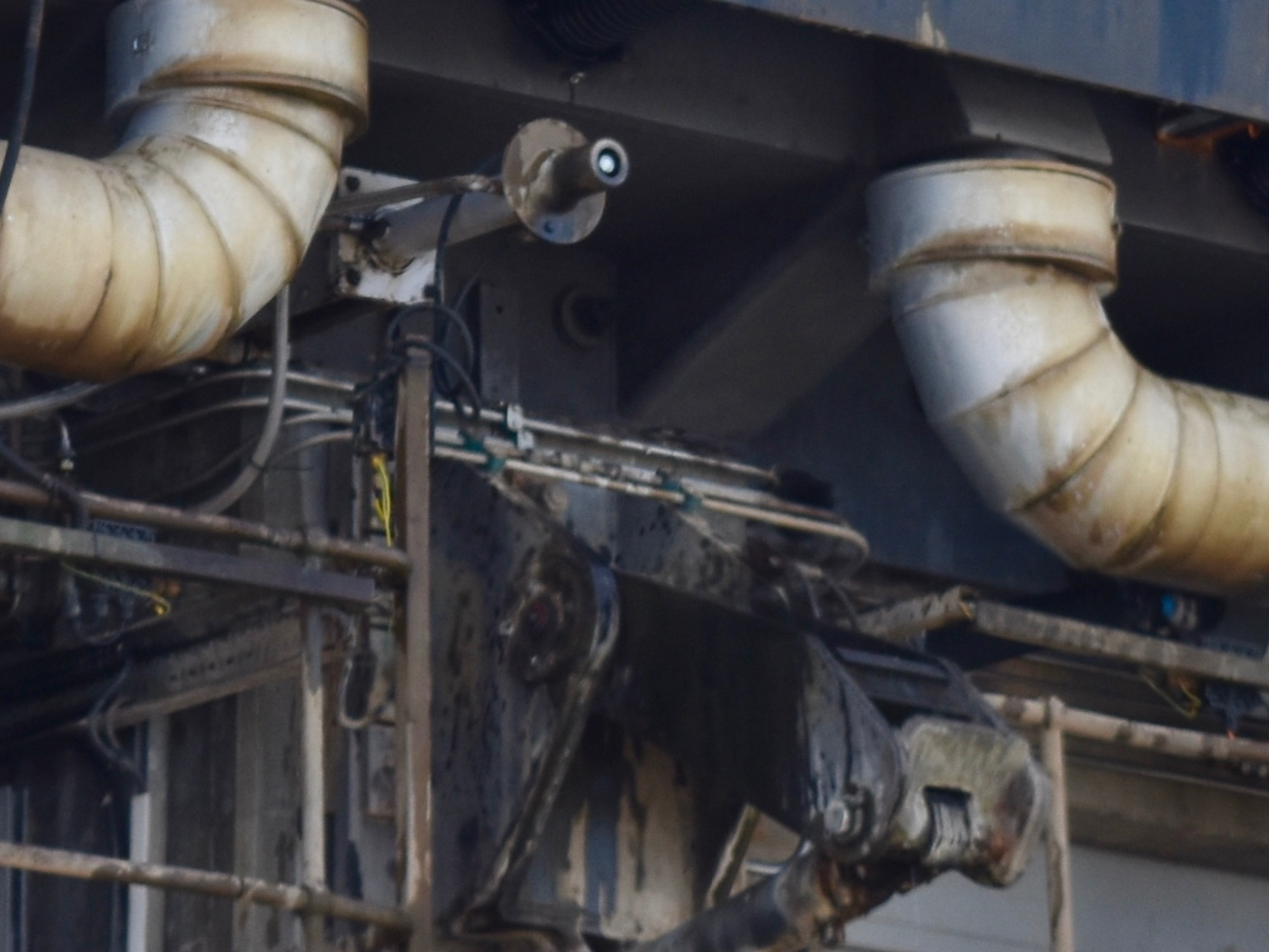
Locking mechanisms include securing pin at the top and hydraulic clamp at the bottom

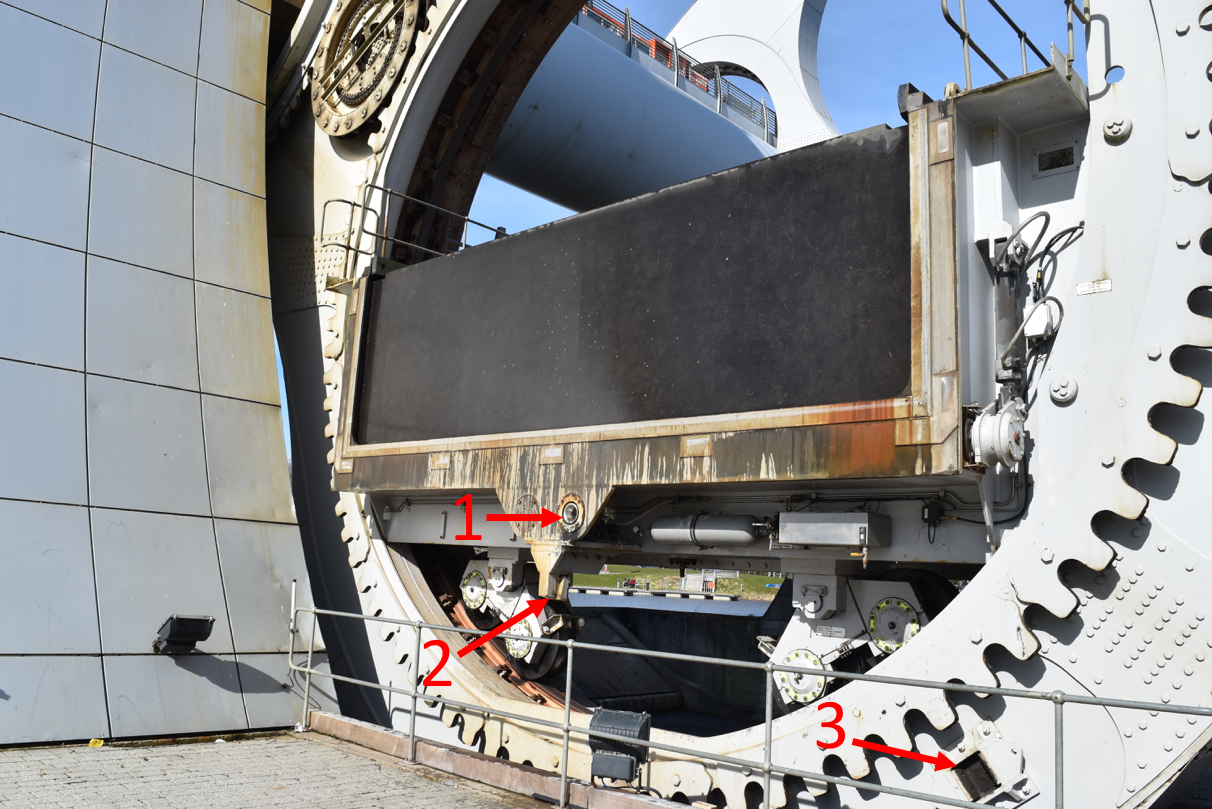
Hydraulic lance receiver and clamp receptors on a caisson (1 and 2), and a wheel securing pin receptor (3)

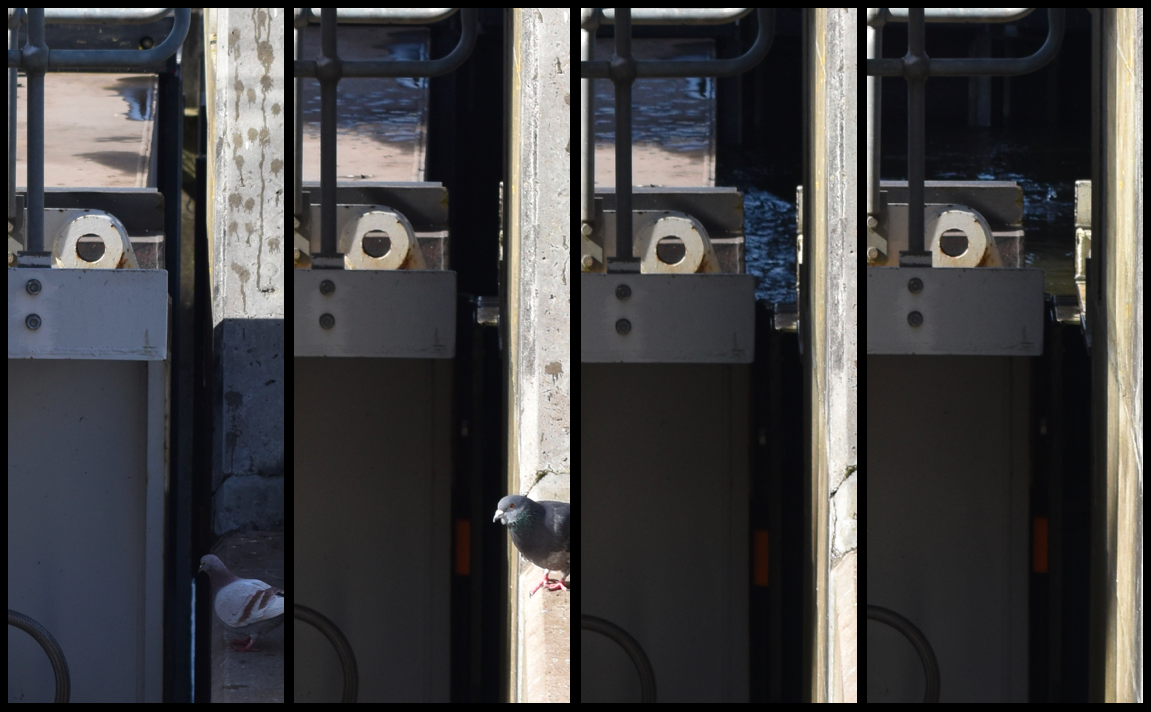
Left to right: caisson door (behind the rail) aligned with basin door but with a gap, u-shape seal extended, water filled, and doors lowered

The doors being lowered at the lower canal basin

=== Engine room ===
The area housing the machinery to drive the wheel is located in the final pillar of the aqueduct, and contains seven chambers connected by ladders. Access is by a door located at ground level or an entrance halfway up the tower, with a gantry crane to facilitate the installation of equipment.

The ground floor houses the transformers for powering the wheel. When the wheel was flooded by vandals in April 2002, this room was filled to within 8 cm (3 in) of the 11 kV busbars. On the first floor is a standby generator and switchgear should the mains supply to the wheel fail. The second floor houses a pair of hydraulic pumps that drive the hydraulic motors in the chamber above. Power is supplied directly to the axle with 10 hydraulic motors, which also double as brakes. Connected to each motor is a 100:1 gear system to reduce the rotation speed.

=== Mechanism ===
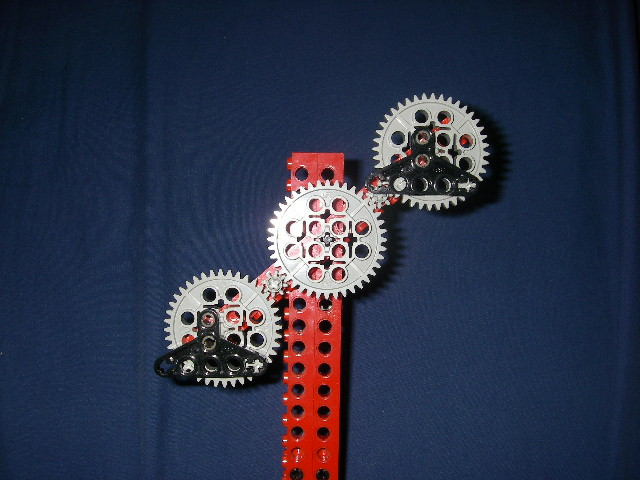
A reconstruction of the mechanism using Lego. Lead architect Tony Kettle used a different Lego model to demonstrate the mechanism to clients and funders.

The caissons are required to turn with the wheel in order to remain level. Whilst the weight of the caissons on the bearings is generally sufficient to rotate them, a gearing mechanism using three large identically sized gears connected by two smaller ones ensures that they turn at precisely the correct speed and remain correctly balanced.

Each end of each caisson is supported on small wheels, which run on rails on the inside face of the 8 m (26 ft) diameter holes at the ends of the arms. The rotation is controlled by a train of gears: an alternating pattern of three 8 m (26 ft) diameter ring gears and two smaller idler gears, all with external teeth, as shown in the picture. The large central gear is fitted loosely over the axle at its machine-room end and fixed in place to prevent it from rotating. The two smaller gears are fixed to each of the arms of the wheel at its machine-room end. When the motors rotate the central axle, the arms swing and the small gears engage the central gear, which results in the smaller gears rotating at a higher speed than the wheel but in the same direction. The smaller gears engage the large ring gears at the end of the caissons, driving them at the same speed as the wheel but in the opposite direction. This cancels the rotation due to the arms and keeps the caissons stable and perfectly level.

=== Docking pit ===
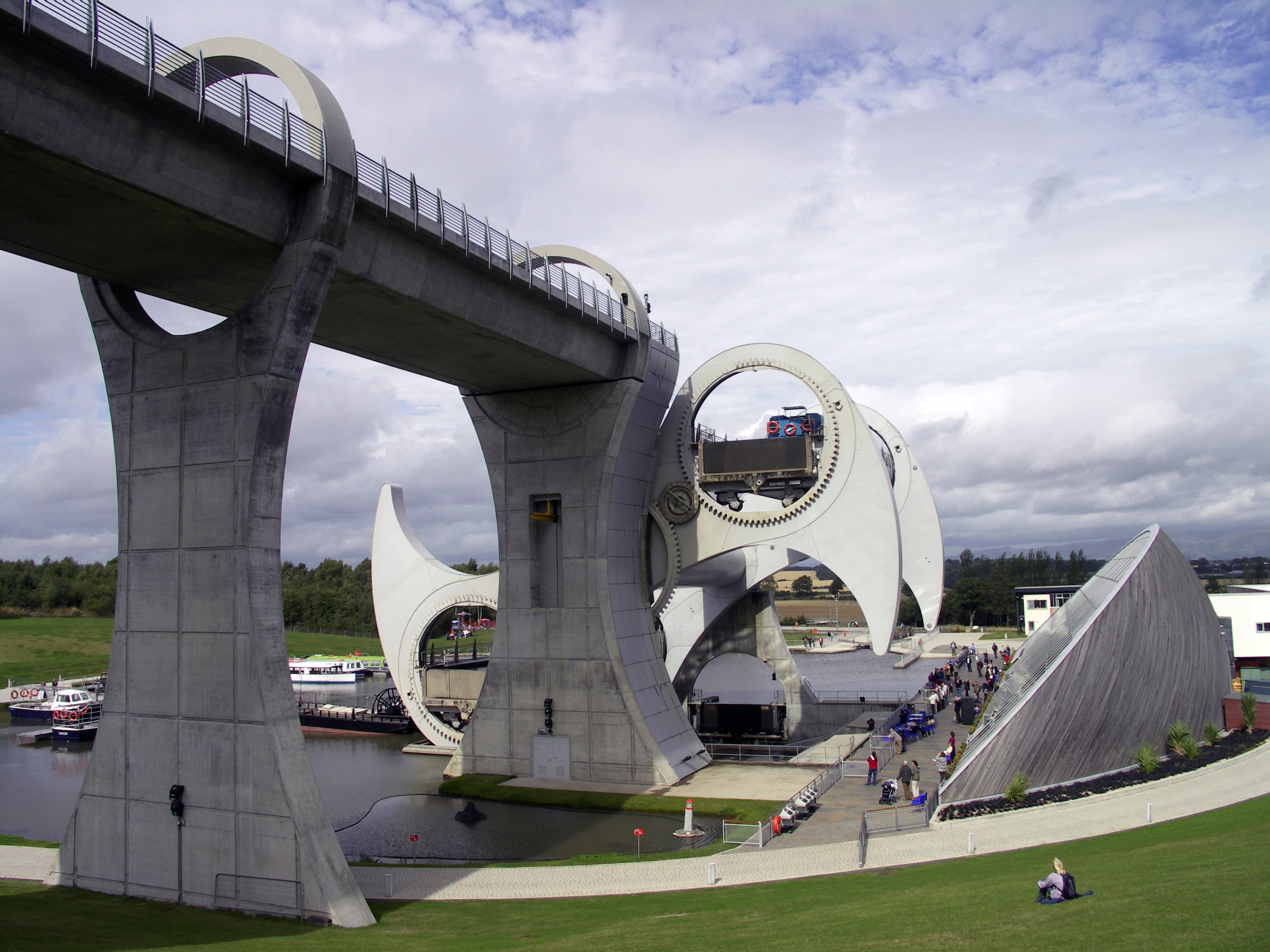
The Falkirk Wheel in action. The wedge-shaped building on the right is the visitors' centre. The docking pit is at the bottom canal.

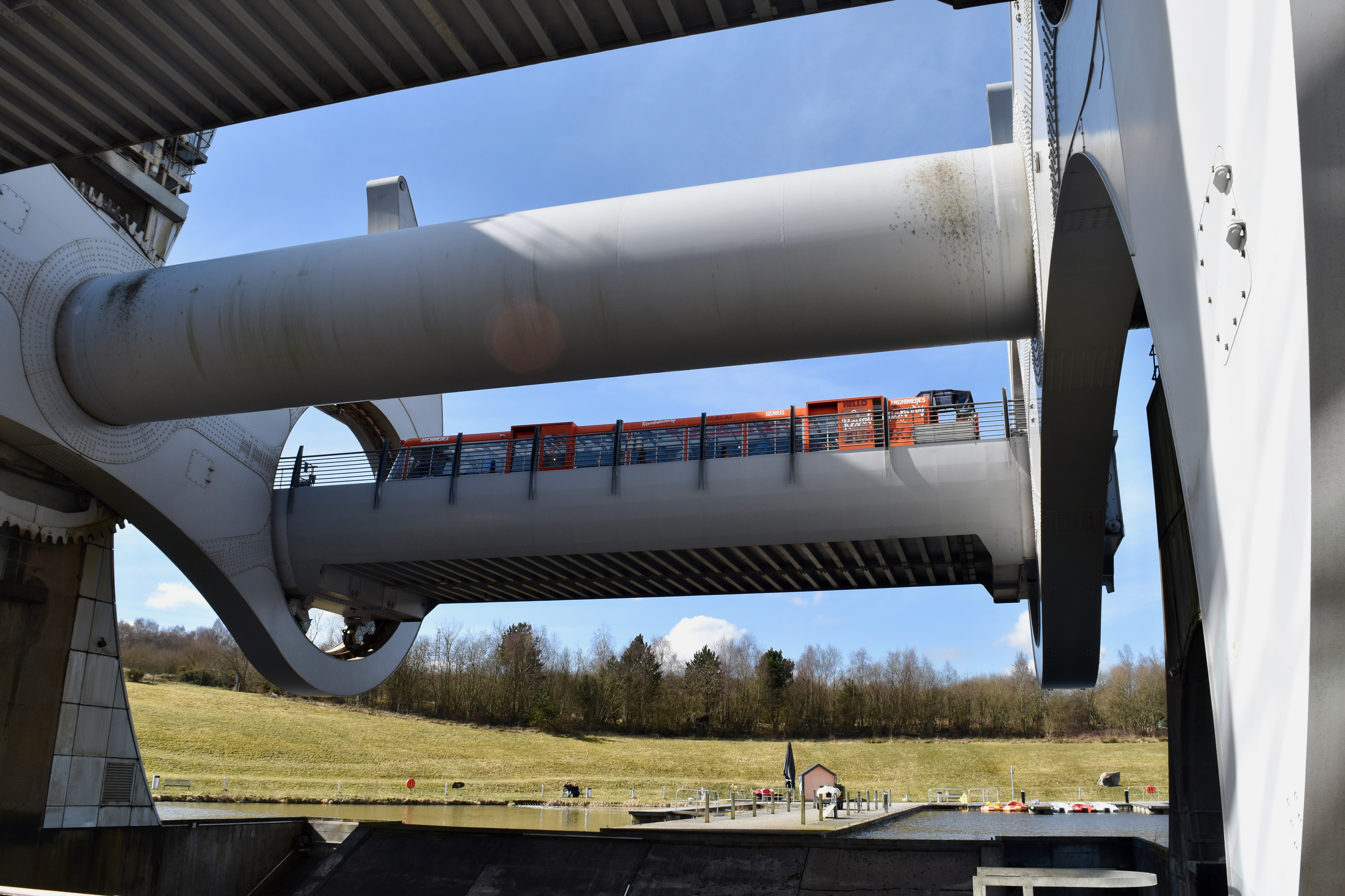
Another view with the docking pit at the bottom

The docking pit is a drydock-like port isolated from the lower canal basin by watertight gates and kept dry by water pumps. When the wheel stops with its arms in the vertical position it is possible for boats to enter and exit the lower caisson when the gates are open without flooding the docking pit. The space below the caisson is empty.

Without the docking pit, the caissons and extremities of the arms of the wheel would be immersed in water at the lower canal basin each time the wheel rotated. The buoyancy of the lower caisson would make it more difficult to turn the wheel.

=== Visitor centre ===
A visitor centre is located on the east side of the lower basin. Boat trips on the wheel depart approximately once an hour. Since the wheel opened, around 5.5 million people have visited and 1.3 million have taken a boat trip, with around 400,000 people visiting the wheel annually.

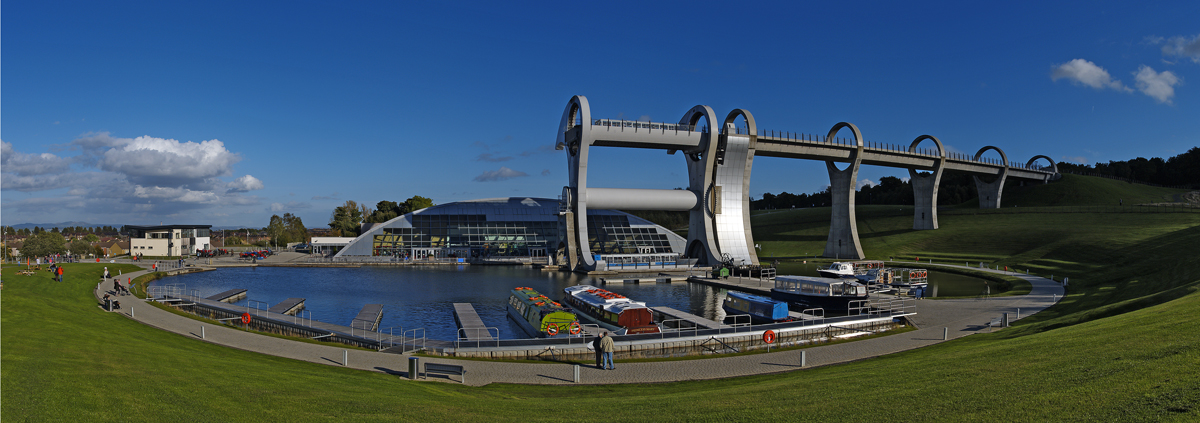
Panoramic view of the wheel and aqueduct

== See also ==
- Anderton boat lift
- Canals of the United Kingdom
- Forth and Clyde Canal Pathway
- Lifts on the old Canal du Centre
- List of boat lifts
- Peterborough Lift Lock
- Strépy-Thieu boat lift
- The Helix (Falkirk)
