= Paul Stallan =

British architect

- Born: 1967 (age 58–59)
- Occupation: Architect
- Awards: Royal Scottish Academy Gold Medal
- Practice: Stallan-Brand
- Buildings: North Glasgow College, Tron Theatre
- Projects: Falkirk Wheel, Glasgow 2014 Athletes' Village, Scottish Parliament

Paul Stallan (born 1967 in Glasgow) is an architect based in the United Kingdom.

== Career ==
Stallan was born in Glasgow in 1967 and was educated at the University of Strathclyde, graduating in 1988 under Professor of Architecture Gordon Benson (of Benson & Forysth Architects). Stallan first worked with Glasgow architect Peter McGurn on major community and urban regeneration projects across the West of Scotland before joining architects RMJM in 1988 as International Design Principal and European Design Director. In 2012, Stallan established Stallan-Brand with architect Alistair Brand after leaving RMJM.

He is best known for designing the 2014 Commonwealth Games Village and his work on the Falkirk Wheel and Scottish Parliament whilst at RMJM. Stallan has also collaborated with notable architects including Frank Gehry, Will Alsop, Joshua Prince Ramus, Rex and for a short period with the late Enric Miralles. Stallan has also appeared on BBC's Building Britain series with presenter Muriel Gray discussing the regeneration of Glasgow's Waterfront. Stallan has been an invited critic and speaker at educational design institutions including the Harvard Design School, Glasgow School of Art and an external examiner at Dundee, Strathclyde and Newcastle University architecture departments. Stallan gave a TED talk in July 2014 on the principles of urban regeneration.

== Awards and recognition ==
RSA Gold Medal – Stallan was awarded a Royal Scottish Academy Gold Medal for Architecture in 1999.

Royal Fine Arts Commissioner (2001–2005) – Paul Stallan was appointed by HM Queen Elizabeth II to serve on The Royal Fine Art Commission for Scotland serving two terms as a Royal Fine Arts Commissioner between 1998–2005.

Executive Director of Architecture and Design Scotland (2005–2011) – Stallan was appointed in 2005 as an executive director of Architecture and Design Scotland (A+DS), the Scottish Government body established to champion architecture and the environment and promote Scotland's first policy on architecture.

Scottish Government Education design champion (2008–2011) – Stallan was appointed by the UK / Scottish Government as an Education Design Champion to promote with local authorities and funding bodies across the country excellence in education architecture. Stallan reported to the Scottish Government's Education, Lifelong Learning and Culture Committee on 23 April 2008 on the condition of the Scottish Schools Estate.

Architect of the Year – Stallan was nominated and then awarded Scottish Architect of the Year in 1999 and 2005 respectively.

Master Planning Consultant of the Year 2013 – Stallan-Brand won the 'Place Making and Master Planning' Consultant of the Year 2013 award at the Scottish Design Awards.

== Arts practice ==
Paul Stallan is an artist, and has exhibited his paintings, sculpture and collages.

== Select architectural projects ==
- African University for the Creative Arts (AUCA), Lagos, Nigeria.
- 2014 Commonwealth Games Village, UK.
- Scottish Parliament, Edinburgh, UK.
- Glasgow's Kelvin College campus at North Glasgow (formerly North Glasgow College).
- Music Performing Arts and Media Faculty at Newcastle College.
- Algiers City Masterplan, Algeria.
- Laurieston Gorbals Masterplan, Glasgow UK.
- New Schools, South Lanarkshire, UK.
- Broomlands Primary School, Kelso, Scottish Borders, UK.
- Falkirk Wheel, Scotland, UK.
- Tron Theatre Refurbishment, Glasgow, UK,
- Assembly for the United Arab Emirates shortlist.
