= Jeremy Vine =

English presenter and journalist (born 1965)

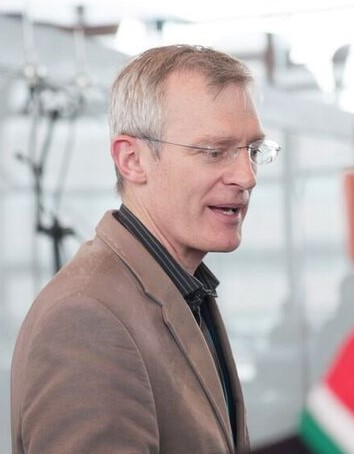
- Vine in 2016
- Born: Jeremy Guy Vine; 17 May 1965 (age 61); Epsom, Surrey, England
- Education: Epsom College; Hatfield College, Durham
- Years active: 1987–present
- Employer(s): BBC, Channel 5
- Known for: Journalist, TV, radio presenter and writer
- Television: Points of View (2008–2018); Eggheads (2008–2023); Make Me an Egghead; Crimewatch; Strictly Come Dancing (2015, 2017 special); Panorama; Newsnight (1999–2002); The Politics Show; Jeremy Vine (2018–present)
- Spouses: Janelle Muntz (m. 1992; div. 2000) Rachel Schofield (m. 2002)
- Children: 2
- Relatives: Tim Vine (brother)

Jeremy Guy Vine (born 17 May 1965) is an English television and radio presenter and journalist. He is best known as the host of his BBC Radio 2 lunchtime programme which presents news, views, interviews with live guests, consumer issues and popular music.

Vine is also the host of the Channel 5 (formerly BBC Two) quiz programme Eggheads, taking over from former host Dermot Murnaghan full-time in 2014. In 2015, he was a contestant on the 13th series of Strictly Come Dancing. Since September 2018, he has presented a Channel 5 weekday current-affairs show, Jeremy Vine.

== Early life and education ==
Vine was born at Epsom Hospital in Epsom, Surrey. He grew up in Cheam, and is the elder son of Guy Vine (1937–2018), lecturer in civil engineering at North East Surrey College of Technology, and Diana (née Tillett), who was a housewife and later a doctor's receptionist. His father was from Hertfordshire, and his mother was from Guildford, the daughter of Rosamond Tillett (née James). His parents married at Christ Church in Guildford on Saturday 21 March 1964. Leslie Tillett, his grandfather (2 June 1901 - 29 April 1960), died in April 1960, aged 58, a chartered accountant in the City of London.

Vine has two siblings: a sister, Sonya, and a brother, Tim, who is a comedian. Vine was privately educated: at Lynton Preparatory School in Ewell, then Aberdour School in Burgh Heath, and then Epsom College.

He played the drums in a band called The Flared Generation, of which his brother Tim was also a member; Smash Hits magazine described them as "the most unfashionable punk band in the country".

At Durham University (Hatfield College), he graduated with a 2:2 undergraduate degree in English. He was a member of the sketch comedy group, The Durham Revue, and was an editor of the student newspaper, Palatinate.

Following a short stint on Metro Radio, Vine enrolled in a journalism training course with the Coventry Evening Telegraph, before joining the BBC in 1987.

== Broadcasting career ==
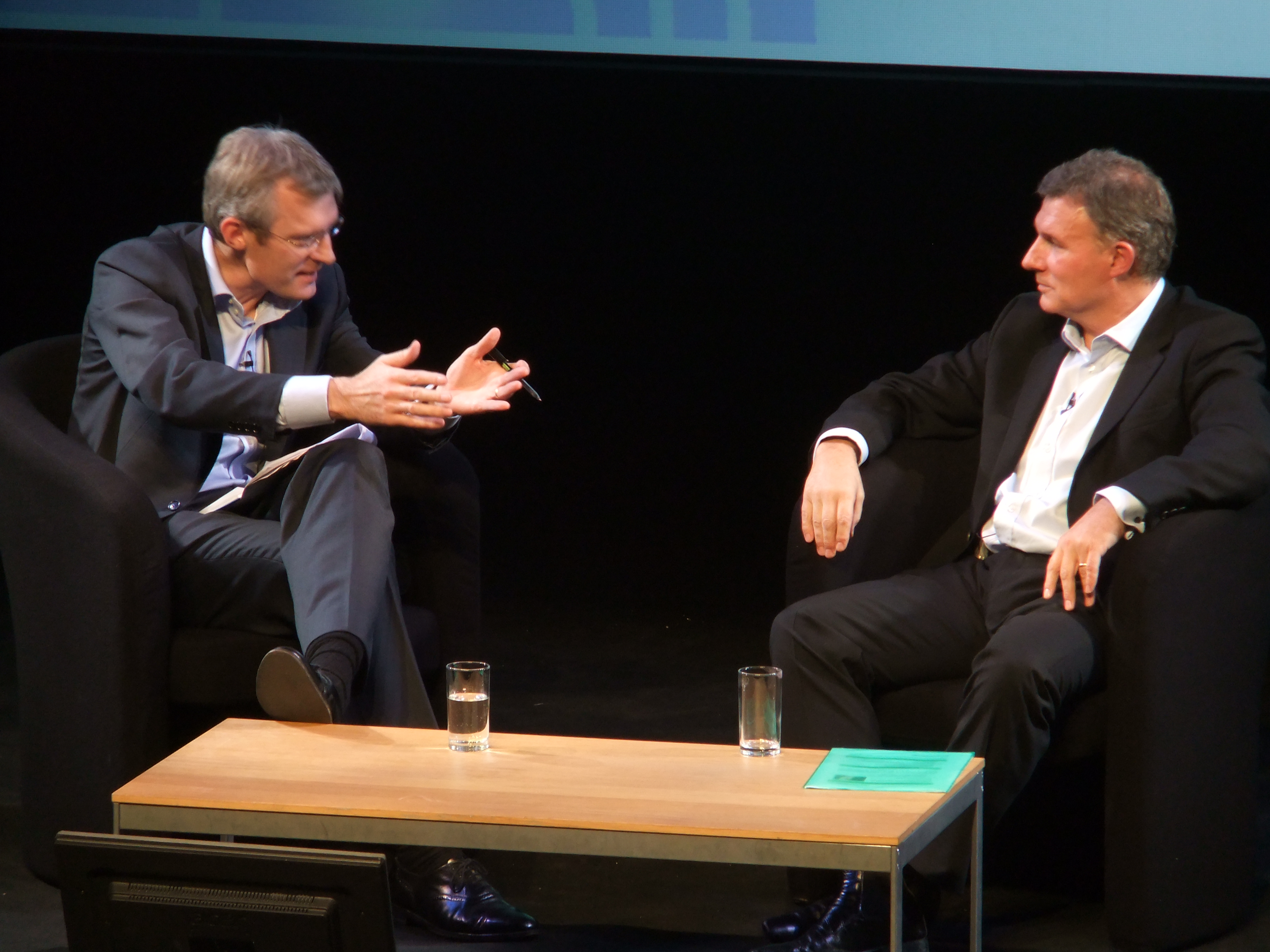
Vine interviewing Ford Ennals at the 2010 Radio Festival

Vine's career at the BBC included reading the news on the radio in Northern Ireland and working as a researcher on the BBC1 series Heart of the Matter. In 1989, he became a regular reporter on the BBC Radio 4 programme Today, filing reports from across Europe.

While working for Today, he published two comic novels set amidst the modern Church of England, including Forget Heaven, Just Kiss Me (1992) and The Whole World in My Hands (1993). Vine now regards them as juvenilia.

In the mid-1990s, Vine became familiar to BBC TV viewers as a political reporter, which included reporting on the ascent of New Labour under Tony Blair. Vine later provided irreverent reports on the 1997 General Election.

Following the 1997 election, Vine became the Africa Correspondent based in Johannesburg, travelling across Africa. Reporting assignments took him to the war front to report on the Eritrean–Ethiopian War, the Angolan Civil War, the violence in Lesotho after South African troops went in and hoisted a South African flag over the Royal Palace, following leadership disputes. He also travelled to Algiers and Kenya, to report during political elections.

Vine was successful in gaining interviews with key leaders in various African nations, including the President of Zimbabwe, Robert Mugabe, and the leader of the Islamist regime in Khartoum, Sudan. Other areas of Africa from which he has reported include Mali, Zambia, Sierra Leone and the Niger Delta (to report on the Nigerian villagers' unrest over the work of the oil companies).

In April 1999, Vine presented an exclusive report on South African police brutality for BBC Two's Newsnight. The film won the Silver Nymph at the Monte Carlo Television Festival and resulted in the suspension of 22 police officers. In July 1999, the BBC announced that Vine was joining Newsnight full-time as a co-presenter, having stood in for Jeremy Paxman over the two previous summers. Paxman was reported to have called Vine "Mini-Me", a reference to the diminutive associate of Dr. Evil in the Austin Powers film series.

Vine was one of the original presenters of Broadcasting House on BBC Radio 4 and presented The Politics Show on BBC One from its launch in 2003 until Jon Sopel took over in 2005.

In May 2006, Vine was announced as Peter Snow's replacement for presenting the BBC election graphics, including the famous Swingometer. His performance on the night of the council elections in England and Wales on 30 April 2008 was widely criticised.

From 2007 until 2009, Vine co-presented the Teaching Awards with Kate Thornton (2007), Myleene Klass (2008) and Christine Lampard (2009).

Between 2007 and 2010, Vine was the presenter of the BBC's flagship and the world's oldest current affairs programme, Panorama, which coincided with the show's move back to a Monday peak-time slot.

From 2008 to 2018, Vine presented Points of View, taking over from Sir Terry Wogan. On 6 October 2008, he started hosting the former BBC Two quiz show Eggheads while the spin-off show, Are You an Egghead?, was presented by the regular host, Dermot Murnaghan. Once the spin-off show had finished, Vine continued to host the second half of each series, with Murnaghan hosting the first half. In Series 16, it was announced that Vine had become the sole presenter. As of 2014, Vine also hosted the spin-off series Revenge of the Egghead. The series ran for a 6-week period, between 24 February and 4 April 2014. On 12 March 2021, it was announced that after 18 years at the BBC, the programme would be moving to Channel 5, and Vine was to continue as host of the show. From 2016 to 2017, Vine co-presented Crimewatch with Tina Daheley.

In September 2018, Vine replaced Matthew Wright as the presenter of Channel 5's weekday morning current affairs show, formerly called The Wright Stuff. The show's name has now changed to Jeremy Vine. Vine said he would continue to present his Radio 2 weekday lunchtime programme. In March 2021, it was announced that Eggheads would be joining his morning current affairs/phone-in show as a programme broadcast on Channel 5, after the BBC put the quiz on hiatus.

=== BBC Radio 2 ===
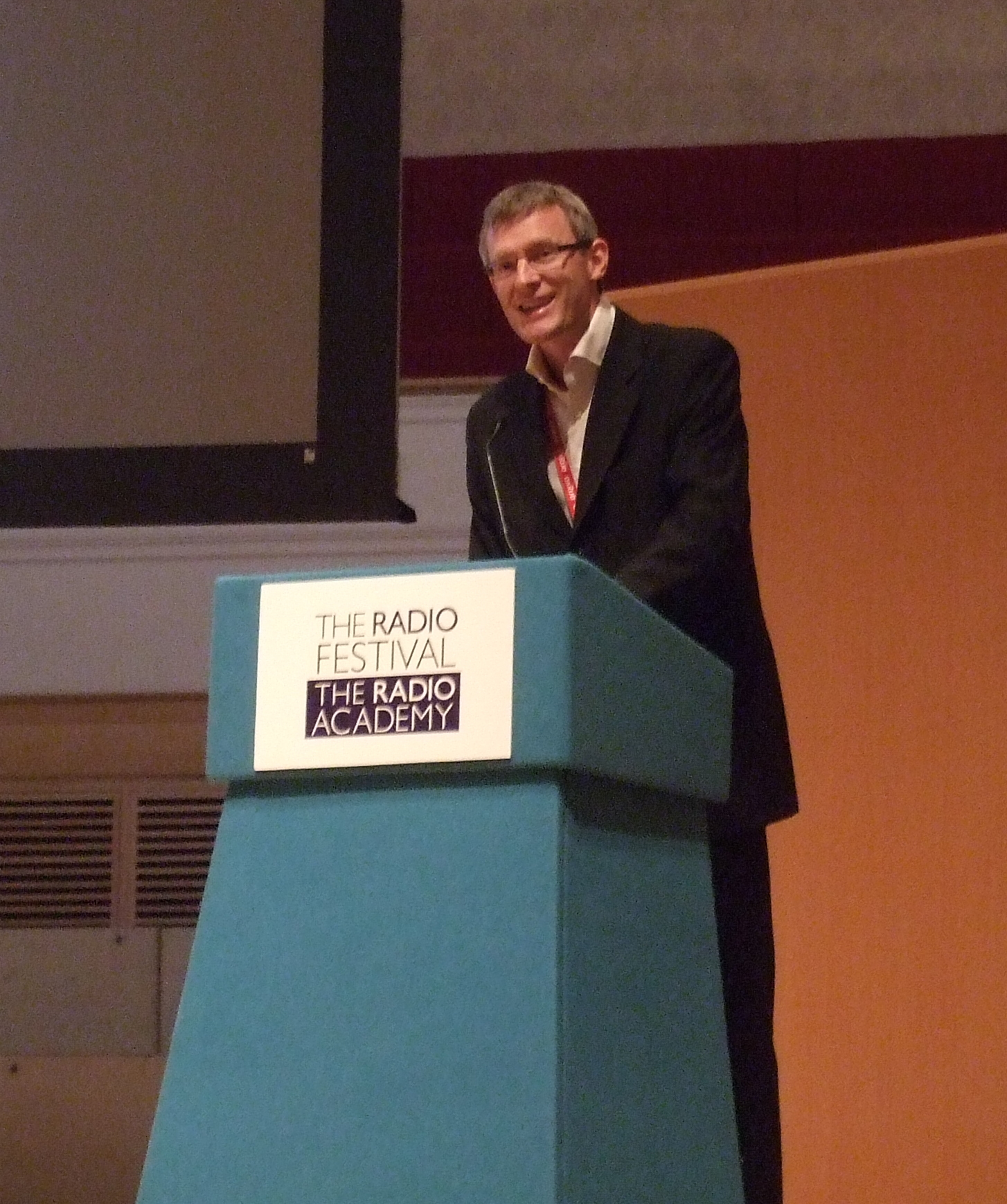
Vine presents the 2008 Radio Festival

On 6 January 2003, after several stints as a stand-in for Jimmy Young on BBC Radio 2, Vine took over the weekday lunchtime show on a regular basis. The show consists of a mix of news-based discussions, including views from listeners, interspersed with popular music. After Vine took over the hosting duties, the show was revamped. While the regular Thursday food slot was dropped, the Monday health and Friday legal advice slots were retooled.

Monday's The Health and Wellbeing Hour included either general practitioner Sarah Jarvis or Rabbi Julia Neuberger, while Friday's Your Money and Your Life, involves a variety of contributors, most frequently Martin Lewis. Since 2003, Friday's shows have frequently included a link-up to Rhondda gardener Terry Walton. For four years, until October 2006, Lucy Berry served as the show's in-house poet.

=== Strictly Come Dancing ===
On 10 August 2015, Vine was the first celebrity to be announced as taking part in the thirteenth series of the popular BBC One competition Strictly Come Dancing. Vine was partnered with professional, Karen Clifton. On the fourth week of the contest, after Vine danced a jive to Bobby Darin’s "Splish Splash", Bruno Tonioli described him as a "Peculiar, off-the-wall artist like Tracey Emin", and Craig Revel Horwood compared him to "a stork that had been struck by lightning."

In week eight of the show he was in the dance-off, alongside Jamelia, and voted out of the show; finishing in ninth place. He also took part in the 2017 Christmas special with the same partner.

== Controversies ==
It was reported on 4 February 2015 that Vine received a five-figure sum for a post-dinner speech at a £250-a-head banquet organised by ADS Group, the trade organisation that represents defence and security industries in the UK, and attended by global arms manufacturers. Campaign Against Arms Trade lodged a formal complaint with the BBC, claiming a conflict for the organisation appearing to support an industry which "profits from dictatorships which silence and suppress debate". This prompted a BBC response saying: "Jeremy is a freelance presenter and so can make personal appearances without speaking on behalf of the BBC, as he did here."

In December 2018, Vine apologised after a tweet suggested people in Wales should speak English. The tweet was deleted after Vine said that the tweet had been taken out of context and that he was talking about a caller to his show who had complained about Welsh people not talking in English in the pubs.

On 25 May 2023, a post from the "Jeremy Vine on 5" Twitter account asked if it was "time to crack down" on sick people claiming out-of-work benefits. The tweet was criticised by disability campaigners who accused it of "trolling" and "demonising" sick people. The tweet was later deleted.

== Personal life ==
Vine was married to an American banker, Janelle Muntz, for seven years, which ended in 2000. Vine stated that it was "very sad", but their jobs and travel meant they had "seen very little" of each other in three years. He married Rachel Schofield, a journalist and news presenter, on 14 September 2002 in Tipton St John, Devon. The couple have two daughters, born in 2004 and 2006. They have lived in Chiswick, London, since around 2007, having previously lived in Brackenbury Village.

Vine is the patron of Radio St Helier, a UK‐registered charity providing hospital radio programmes to patients at St Helier Hospital in Carshalton.

Vine is a practising Anglican and attends church. He has deplored what he sees as the marginalisation of Christians in British society, stating in 2009 that "You can't express views that were common currency 30 or 40 years ago".

In August 2016, a car driver threatened and was abusive to Vine while he was cycling along Hornton Street in Kensington, London. Vine captured the encounter on his helmet camera, later broadcasting it on YouTube where it was viewed several million times. Vine also reported it to the police. On 18 April 2017, the car driver was given a 1 month jail sentence for using threatening behaviour, for driving without reasonable consideration for other road users, and for driving without valid road tax. At the time of the incident, she was subject to a suspended sentence for various other offences; the remaining 8 months of this sentence was re-activated resulting in a total jail sentence of 9 months. She was also ordered to pay a victims surcharge of £130.

In January 2018, Vine was one of six male BBC presenters who voluntarily took a pay cut when the gap between men's and women's pay at the BBC was revealed.

In October 2021, anti-vaccine campaigners protested outside Vine's home, objecting to the BBC's coverage of COVID-19 vaccines. As Vine was not at home at the time, they presented their "anti-vaxx writ", a document without legal authority, to his wife. He later posted videos of the incident online. Vine has said he contracted COVID-19 and commented on receiving the vaccine.

In February 2022, Vine was "knocked out cold for a minute or two" after falling 8 ft (2.4 m), onto grass, from his penny-farthing bicycle. He was taken to Charing Cross Hospital where doctors told him he was "lucky to have just a black eye and some aches from the fall".

In August 2022, Alex Belfield, a former BBC Radio Leeds presenter and the host of YouTube channel "Alex Belfield - The Voice of Reason", was convicted at Nottingham Crown Court of stalking Vine and three others. Vine described Belfield as "the Jimmy Savile of trolling", and said he had been subjected to an "avalanche of hatred" and a "constant bombardment" of harassing tweets and YouTube videos. Vine also told the court that he feared Belfield or one of his followers would go to his home, which led him to putting a picture up of Belfield so that his family could recognise him. Vine also sued Belfield for defamation. The next month, on 16 September, Belfield was sentenced. The "simple stalking" element relating to the case involving Vine resulted in a sentence of thirteen weeks; this was added to the other sentences to provide an overall sentence of five-and-a-half years.

In May 2024, judge Mrs Justice Steyn in the High Court ruled in favour of Vine, who had sued former footballer Joey Barton for libel over posts on Twitter; 11 of the 14 cited tweets were found to be defamatory. Barton had repeatedly called Vine a "bike nonce", a vulgar British term for a paedophile, and had falsely associated Vine with paedophiles including Jimmy Savile and Jeffrey Epstein.

== Filmography ==
=== Television ===
Year	Title	Role	Channel
1999–2002	Newsnight	Presenter	BBC Two BBC News
2015, 2018	Strictly Come Dancing	Contestant	BBC One
2003–05	The Politics Show	Presenter	BBC One
2005–06	This Week	Reporter	BBC One
2007–15	Panorama	Presenter	BBC One
2008–18	Points of View	Presenter	BBC One
2008–2023	Eggheads	Presenter	BBC Two 2008–2020 Channel 5 2021–2023
2015–18	Strictly Come Dancing: It Takes Two	Himself	BBC Two
2016	Peter Pan Goes Wrong	Eggheads host	BBC One
2016–17	Crimewatch	Presenter	BBC One
2017–18	The One Show	Presenter	BBC One
2018–present	Jeremy Vine	Presenter	Channel 5
2019	Quizmaster	Presenter	ITV
2021	Celebrity Gogglebox	Himself; alongside Snoochie Shy	Channel 4
2025–present	Celebrity Puzzling	Presenter	Channel 5

=== Radio ===
Year	Title	Role	Station
2003–present	Jeremy Vine	Presenter	BBC Radio 2
2024	Money Gone	himself	BBC Radio 4 drama

== Awards and honours ==
Vine was named Speech Broadcaster of the Year at the 2005 and 2011 Sony Awards. At the latter, the 2010 election interview with Gordon Brown, in which the then-Prime Minister put his head in his hands as he was played the recording of him calling a voter a bigot, won Vine the Sony Award for Interview of the Year.

== Bibliography ==
- Forget Heaven, Just Kiss Me. Hodder & Stoughton. 1993. ISBN 978-0340589854
- The Whole World in My Hands. Hodder & Stoughton. 1994. ISBN 978-0340612415
- It's All News to Me. Simon & Schuster. 2013. ISBN 978-1849837774
- What I Learnt: What My Listeners Say – and Why We Should Take Notice. W&N. 2017. ISBN 978-1474604925
- The Diver and The Lover (2020)
- Murder on Line One (2025)
