= Matthew Wright (presenter) =

English television presenter and journalist

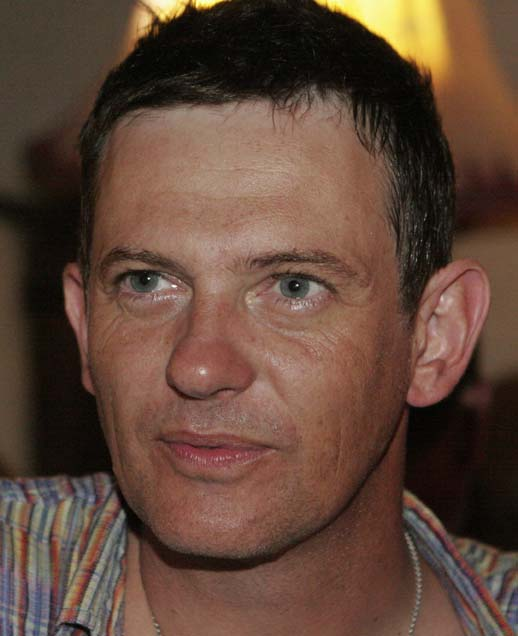
- Wright in 2005
- Born: Alexander Matthew Wright; 8 July 1965 (age 61); Richmond upon Thames, Surrey, England
- Education: University of Exeter
- Occupations: Television presenter, radio presenter, journalist
- Years active: 1990–present
- Spouse: Amelia Gatte (m. 2010)
- Children: 1
- Website: matthewwrightofficial.com

Alexander Matthew Wright (born 8 July 1965) is an English television and radio presenter and former tabloid journalist. He worked as a journalist for The Sun and was a showbusiness gossip columnist for the Daily Mirror before launching a television career. He hosted the Channel 5 topical debate show The Wright Stuff from 2000 to 2018. Wright also presents on radio station LBC and occasionally appears on This Morning to discuss current affairs.

== Early life and education ==
Wright started his career at the age of 14, appearing in the Children's Film Foundation production Big Wheels and Sailor (1979).

He was educated at the voluntary-aided Roman Catholic boys' school, The John Fisher School in Purley, Croydon, Surrey and was in the same class as the artist and sculptor Diarmuid Bryon O'Connor and DJ Gilles Peterson.

When joining the school, he began as a grammar entrant, having passed the 11-plus, but the school only remained (officially) as a grammar school for one more year, so he saw the gradual transformation into a comprehensive school.

He also attended Croydon Youth Theatre. Following school, Wright attended the University of Exeter, graduating in English and Drama.

== Career ==
Wright started at the Surrey Mail group of newspapers in Godalming as a junior journalist under the tutorledge of editor Peter Tribe. Wright became a showbusiness correspondent with The Sun and later wrote a column for the Daily Mirror in the 1990s, with future 3AM girl Polly Graham as his assistant. During his time at the Daily Mirror, Wright covered numerous celebrity stories, including the wedding of Phil Collins and Orianne Cevey in 1999, which he said was the longest wedding he had ever been to. In 2002, Wright was a contributor to Phil Collins: A Life Less Ordinary, a BBC television documentary which profiled Collins's career, which was subsequently released commercially.

In 1998, Wright and the Daily Mirror were successfully sued for libel for £20,000 by actor David Soul, after Wright referred to the play The Dead Monkey in a review as being "without doubt the worst West End show I have ever seen", despite not having seen it. Wright also made several other false claims about the play in his article. Soul stated that Wright was "using the play as an excuse to attack me personally".

=== The Wright Stuff ===
Wright left the Daily Mirror in 2000 to pursue a television career and launch the website mykindaplace.com. He was chosen to front Channel 5's daily topical discussion series The Wright Stuff, which started broadcasting in September 2000. Wright originally co-presented the series with panellists James O'Brien and Kate Silverton. After a couple of years, O'Brien and Silverton were replaced by a new panel every week and the series began attracting celebrities to guest on the panel every day.

In 2002, Wright named John Leslie live on air as the television presenter being linked to the alleged rape of Ulrika Jonsson. Wright subsequently said he could not remember saying Leslie's name during the show. In a Sky 1 show, John Leslie: My Year of Hell, Wright offered Leslie an apology. Leslie confirmed he would not sue Wright, saying: "I think he just made a really big mistake and unfortunately I was the one paying the price."

In October 2011, Wright asked male viewers of The Wright Stuff if they would have sex with Amanda Knox, who had just been acquitted of the murder of Meredith Kercher. Wright introduced a debate on Knox's future with an on-screen caption headed "Foxy Knoxy: Would Ya?" and told viewers: "She's entirely innocent. She's also undeniably fit and loves wild sex. Or did. So if you were a guy who'd met her in a bar and she invited you back to hers, would you go?" Wright apologised for the segment the following day, stating: "While I'm not going to apologise for discussing Amanda Knox's future after all the terrible things the media has said about her these past four years, I do want to say sorry for the way I framed the debate. The on-screen title was wrong, no doubt about it."

In December 2011, during a discussion on his show about the murder of Scottish teenager Liam Aitchison, Wright said in a mock Scottish accent: "There's been another murder!", a reference to the television series Taggart. This led to more than 2,000 viewer complaints and an investigation by regulator Ofcom. This edition of The Wright Stuff resulted in more complaints being made to Ofcom than any other programme in 2011. Wright personally wrote to Aitchison's family by way of apology.

Wright announced on 1 May 2018 that he was to leave The Wright Stuff after 18 years. Wright's last show was broadcast on 14 June 2018, and various guest presenters took turns at presenting throughout the forthcoming summer. The show has continued with Jeremy Vine hosting Jeremy Vine.

=== Other broadcasting and media ===
In 2007, Wright was announced as the lead presenter on BBC One's Inside Out programme in the London area.

In September 2011, Wright joined the Daily Star Sunday as a columnist, but was dropped by the newspaper in March 2012.

In November 2013, Wright appeared in the 13th series of I'm a Celebrity...Get Me Out of Here!. During this time on the series, The Wright Stuff was guest-presented by Richard Madeley for almost a month. He was the fourth participant to be voted out of the series in a double eviction with campmate Vincent Simone on 3 December.

In September 2018, Wright joined national speech station Talkradio presenting weekday afternoons. He left the station in March 2020. In November 2023, Wright replaced Andrew Castle on Weekend Breakfast at LBC.

== Personal life ==
Wright's first marriage ended in a bitter legal battle that he said "made me wary of relationships". In 2003, he started a relationship with Closer columnist Caroline Monk, who later competed on the reality television series Big Brother. He met his second wife, Amelia Gatte, at a garden party held by their mutual friend Miriam Stoppard. They married in 2010. In November 2013, they stated they were trying to conceive a baby with the help of in vitro fertilisation but three of their IVF pregnancies so far had ended in a miscarriage. His wife is unable to become pregnant naturally following an ectopic pregnancy. In September 2018 it was announced they were expecting their first child. Their daughter, Cassady, was born in January 2019.

Despite his relationships with women, Wright has said that he is "a slightly camp man. I can't be any other way, so if people want to imagine that they're my gay lovers, more power to them." Wright has said that "everyone thinks I'm gay".

Wright is a fan of live music and regularly attends concerts. In 2003, he performed on stage with his favourite band, Hawkwind, at the London Astoria, after interviewing the band's frontman Dave Brock on radio. He is now a friend of the band. He also released a single with them, "Spirit of the Age", in 2006, and is credited on their album Take Me To Your Leader, released the same year. A fan of progressive rock, Wright was the host of Prog magazine's annual Progressive Music Awards for four years until 2017.
