= Sarah Jarvis =

British medical doctor, writer, and broadcaster (born 1962)

Sarah Jarvis MBE FRCGP
- Born: Sarah Caroline Jarvis; 3 December 1962 (age 63); London, England
- Education: Millfield
- Alma mater: University of Oxford, University of Cambridge
- Occupations: General practitioner, broadcaster, television doctor
- Television: Good Morning Britain; Jeremy Vine; ITV News; The One Show

Sarah Caroline Jarvis MBE FRCGP (born 3 December 1962) is an English general practitioner, broadcaster, and television doctor.

== Early life ==
Jarvis was educated at Millfield, Street, Somerset.

== Career ==
Jarvis qualified as a medical doctor in July 1986 from the University of Oxford with BM BCh degrees, having graduated from the University of Cambridge with a pre-clinical degree in 1983, and was later awarded the Fellowship of the Royal College of General Practitioners.

Jarvis resigned as a partner and GP trainer after 27 years in her Shepherd's Bush practice; she had joined the practice in 1990. She now works as a locum.

She is the health and medical reporter for The One Show; she is also a television doctor on Good Morning Britain, ITV News and Jeremy Vine; and she is a regular guest on the Mondays edition of "The Jeremy Vine Show" on BBC Radio 2. She is also the Clinical Director for health website Patient UK.

Jarvis was appointed an MBE in the 2018 New Year Honours list for services to general practice and public understanding of health.

== Personal life ==
Jarvis lives in Warwickshire with her husband, Tim, and their English Springer Spaniel. She is a mother of two, a keen gardener and enjoys walking and scuba diving.

== Selected works ==
- Jarvis, Sarah; Rubin, Alan, L (May 2007). Diabetes for Dummies (UK ed.). John Wiley & Sons. ISBN 978-0-470-05810-7.
- Jarvis, Sarah, ed. (2 January 2009). Women's Health for Life. Dorling Kindersley. ISBN 978-1-4053-5378-6.
- Humphrys, John; Jarvis, Sarah (2 April 2009). The Welcome Visitor: Living Well, Dying Well (1st ed.). Hodder & Stoughton. ISBN 978-0-340-92377-1.
