= Richard Stanton-Jones =

- Born: 25 September 1926; Bombay, India
- Died: 23 January 1991 (aged 64); Seaview, Isle of Wight, United Kingdom
- Citizenship: British
- Education: King's College, Cambridge
- Known for: The Hovercraft, Black Knight, Blue Streak
- Awards: Elmer A. Sperry Award, 1968
- Scientific career
- Fields: Engineering

Richard Stanton-Jones (25 September 1926 – 23 January 1991) was an English aeronautical engineer, chief designer Saunders-Roe, managing director of British Hovercraft Corp. and vice-chairman of Westland Helicopters.

He is perhaps best known for his contribution, along with Sir. Christopher Cockerell, to the development of the SR.N1 hovercraft manufactured by Saunders-Roe.

== Life ==
Richard Stanton-Jones was born in Bombay, India to Indian Army Officer, Brig. John C. Jones OBE and Katharine Stanton, daughter of the American missionary Rev. Dr. William A Stanton.

He attended King Edward VI College, Stourbridge, King's College, Cambridge and the College of Aeronautics, Cranfield.

In 1950, Richard Stanton-Jones joined De Havilland Engine Co. He worked under A.V. Cleaver in the DH special projects section.

In 1949, he married Dorine Mary Watkins, and in 1950 they had a son, Richard Stanton-Jones Jr.

In 1968 Richard Stanton-Jones won the Sperry Award along with Sir. Christopher Cockerell "...for the design, construction and application of a family of commercially useful hovercraft."

Richard Stanton-Jones died of lung cancer at his house, "Doubloon," Seaview, Isle of Wight, United Kingdom on 23 January 1991.

== Publications ==
R. Stanton Jones, (1950) "An empirical method for rapidly estimating the loading distributions on swept back wings" pp. 17–23

R. Stanton-Jones, M.A., D.C.Ae., C.Eng., A.F.R.Ae.S., (1993) "The Future Development of Hovercraft: The 1968 Lord Sempill Paper", Aircraft Engineering and Aerospace Technology, Vol. 40 Iss: 5, pp. 4–15

Business positions
Preceded by Maurice Brennan	Chief Designer of Saunders-Roe; 1959-	Succeeded by Company defunct
