= Shiplift =

Device for lifting a ship out of the water

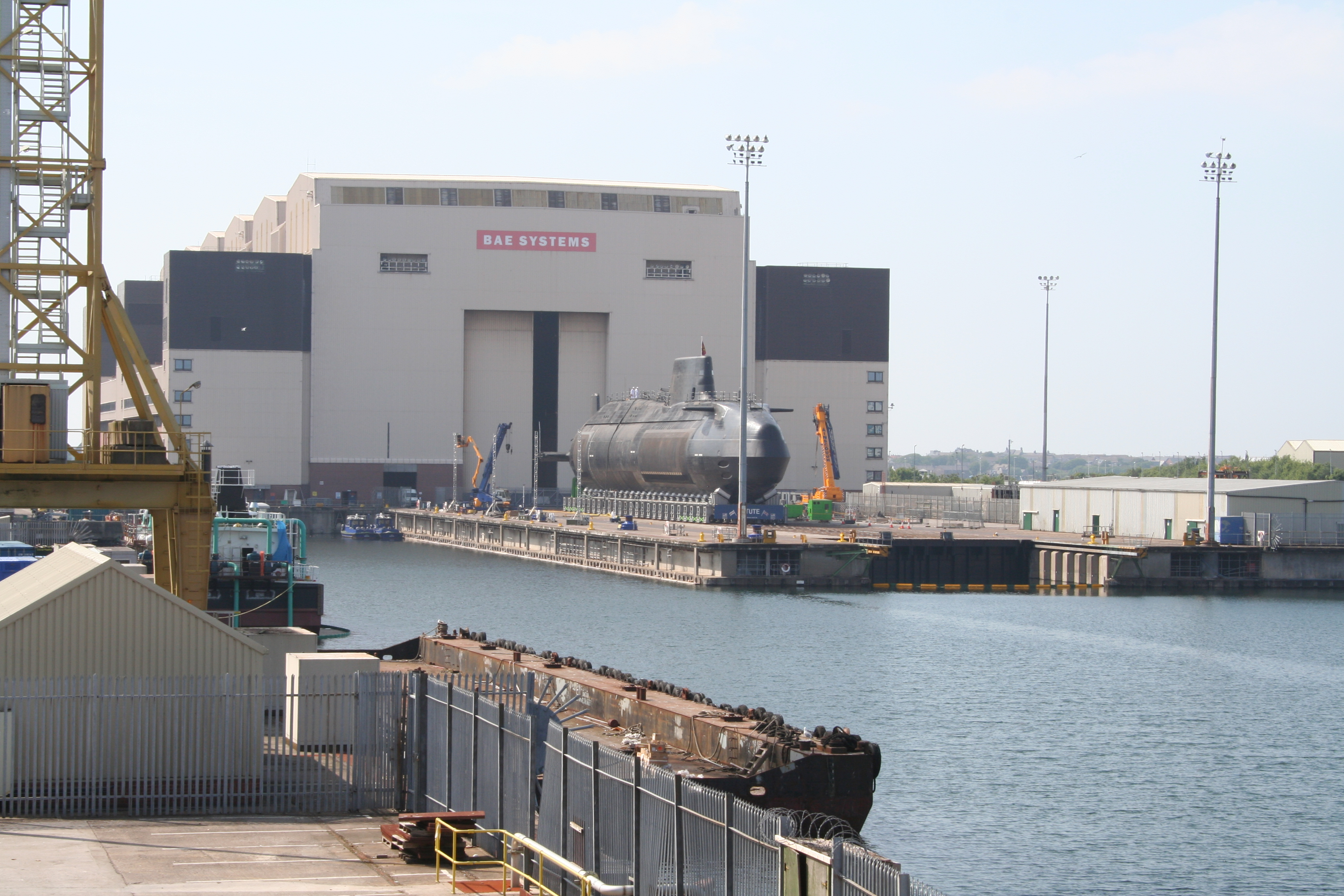
Submarine HMS Astute on a shiplift, being brought out of the building hall towards the water

A shiplift is a modern alternative for a slipway, a floating dry dock or a graving dry dock. A shiplift is used to dry dock and launch ships. It consists of a structural platform that is lifted and lowered exactly vertically, synchronously by a number of hoists. First, the platform is lowered underwater, then the ship is floated above the support, and finally the platform with support and ship is lifted and the ship is brought to the level of the quay.

== Design ==
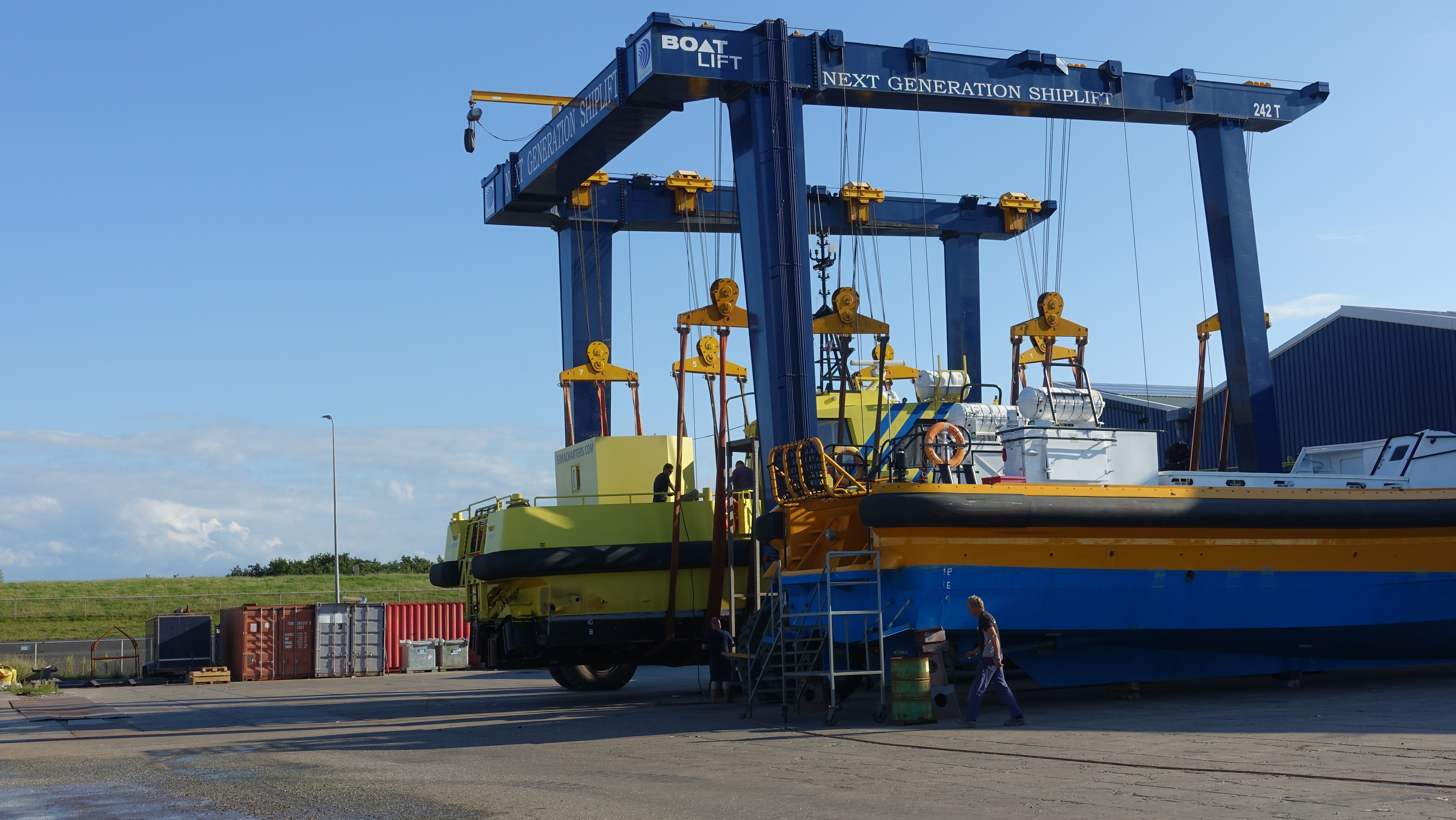
Shiplift in Lauwersoog, the Netherlands

Shiplifts are often supplied under rules of a classification authority. Lloyd's Register of Shipping is the authority with most experience in the certification or classification of shiplifts. Whereas "shiplift" is the word that is normally used, the term used by Lloyd's register is "Mechanical Lift Dock".

There are two different kinds of platform design, the articulated and the rigid. The articulated platform has hinged connections between the main and the longitudinal beams. A rigid platform, the beams are bolted or welded together.

The Syncrolift System was invented by Raymond Pearlson, who was later awarded the Sperry Award for the invention, development and worldwide implementation of a new system for lifting ships out of the water for repair and for launching new ship construction.

== Transfer System ==
Many shiplifts use a transfer system for ships so that the vessels can be transported from the water to a parking place where they can be painted or repaired. One shiplift can serve many parking places, while a dry docking installation can only dock one ship.

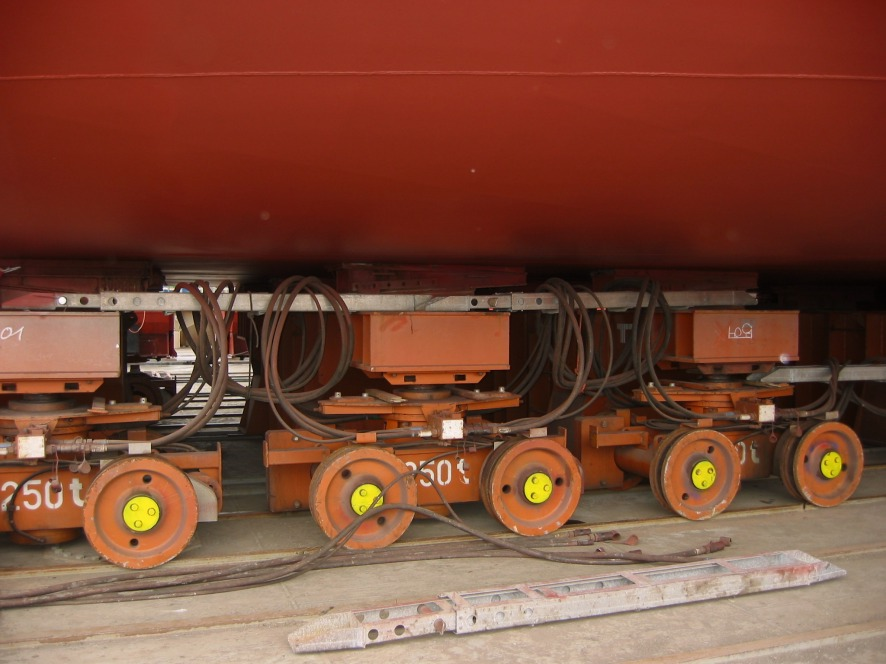
Ship on a transfer system on a shiplift

For large vessels the transfer system consists of a number of trolleys or cradles, supported by high capacity steel wheels. The wheels drive on heavy duty rails. The transport can be one directional, but in order to serve more parking places, two directional systems are used. These two directional systems make use of a traverser carriage or sometimes the wheels of the trolleys can be turned over 90 degrees. Above the wheels often hydraulic cylinders are located so that the ship can be transported upon a so-called Syncrolift® Fluid Bed™. The cylinders are also used to lower the ships on a static support, so that the transfer system with the active elements can be recovered.

== Pleasure Craft ==
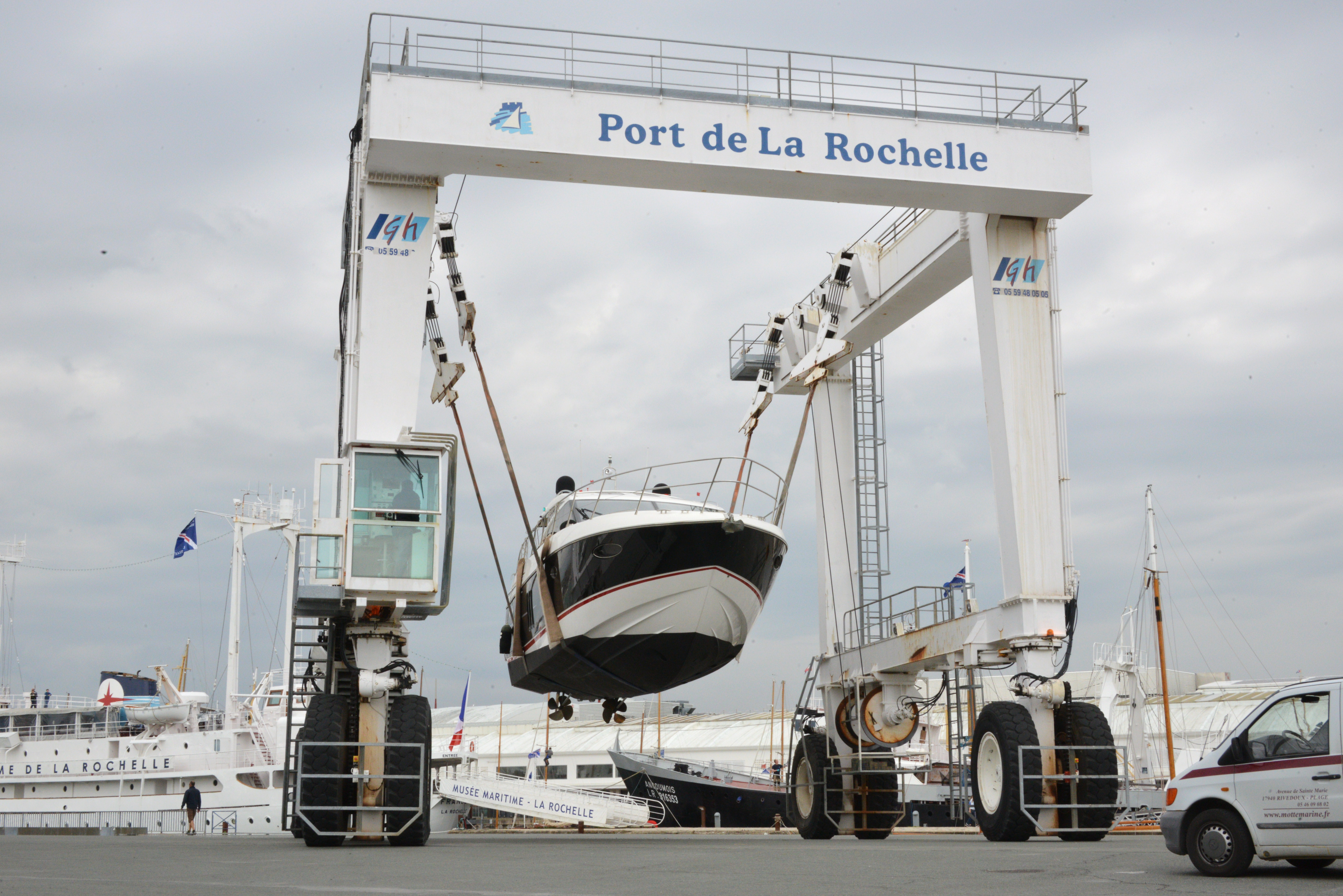
A small motor-boat lifted from the water by a boat lift at La Rochelle, France, 2016

Smaller devices called "Boat lifts" are available that simply raise yachts, sailboats, or small watercraft above the water level at a dock for storage, for reduced maintenance cost and increased security. They can be operated by cables, by hydraulics, or by air flotation and some are "drive on" to segmented flexing supports.

Even smaller, are devices sometimes called "Portable boat lifts" which are easily transported cranes that allow one person to separate a boat from a trailer by themselves.

== See also ==
- Syncrolift
- Boat lift
- Dry dock
- Patent slip (1818 marine railway)
- Slipway
- Travel lift
