= Harold Froehlich =

Harold Froehlich may refer to:

- Harold Vernon Froehlich (born 1932), American politician who served in the U.S. House of Representatives
- Harold E. Froehlich (1923–2007), American engineer who designed deep-diving exploratory submarine
