= Oliver K. Kelley =

Kelley in 1963

Oliver K. Kelley (a.k.a. O.K. Kelley, born Olavi Koskenhovi; 28 June 1904 – 28 March 1987) was a Finnish-born American engineer involved in developing the automatic transmission at the General Motors Corporation in the 1940s.

== Early life and career ==
Kelley in 1957

Kelley was born Olavi Koskenhovi in Salo, Finland, on June 28, 1904. He immigrated to the United States from Finland in 1921 at age 17 and changed his name to Oliver K. Kelley. He was educated at Chicago Technical College, where he received B.S. and M.E. degrees graduating in 1925, and he later took automotive engineering courses at the Massachusetts Institute of Technology. Kelley worked for Nash Motor, Milwaukee, as a draftsman. According to his obituary, he joined GM in 1927 as a draftsman at Cadillac. In 1929 Kelley began working for the G.M.C. Truck and Coach Division, where he worked on transmission problems, including air-shift synchromesh bus transmissions, hydraulic torque-converter bus transmissions, and infinitely variable friction drives. According to Harry Barr, a retired GM vice president of engineering staff, Kelley was a project engineer at Cadillac in 1937, and in 1938–39 he headed the Product Study Group for automatic transmissions, where he worked on the fluid coupling that became the heart of the Hydra-Matic. In June 1936, Kelley joined Earl A. Thompson's engineering group at the General Motors (GM) Engineering Department. This group combined a fluid coupling with a unique hydraulically controlled, automatically shifting four-speed planetary transmission, introduced as an option on 1940 Oldsmobiles as Hydra-Matic, the world's first mass-produced fully automatic transmission. According to The Flint Journal, Kelley became a member of the GM engineering staff in 1937, was appointed assistant chief engineer of GM's Detroit Transmission Division two years later, and rejoined the engineering staff in 1940 in charge of transmission development.

In 1957, after 17 years as head of the transmission group, Kelley became Buick Motor Division's sixth chief engineer, succeeding Verner P. Mathews; Gilbert K. Hause succeeded him as head of the transmission development group. According to Motor Trend, his first significant contribution at Buick was its aluminum brake drums; he introduced the bar-type speedometer in 1959 and directed the original research and development of the 1961 Buick Special and its aluminum V8 engine, and he designed a constant-velocity universal joint into the 1961 Special and full-size Buicks. On January 1, 1960, he turned the Special and aluminum V8 projects over to his successor, Lowell A. Kintigh. According to Motor Trend, in 1960 Kelley went into GM's newly created Defense Systems Division as director of military vehicular systems. The Flint Journal gave the year as 1959 and reported that in 1961 he returned to the GM engineering staff in charge of program development. On June 7, 1963, GM announced his appointment as director of the engineering development departments of the GM engineering staff at the GM Technical Center in Warren, where he coordinated departments including power transmission, structure and suspension, vehicle and product cost. He still held that post in January 1964. From April 1966 until his retirement, Kelley was executive assistant to Harry F. Barr, GM vice president of engineering staff. Kelley retired on September 1, 1967, after 40 years with GM. Kelley died at his home in Bloomfield Hills, Michigan, on March 28, 1987, at the age of 82, and was buried in Providence, Rhode Island.

== Notable achievements ==
In 1939, upon the departure of Earl A. Thompson, Kelley became the head of the GM transmission group (a 1943 history of Ferndale gives 1940) where he was involved in developing, the Buick Dynaflow (introduced by Buick in 1948), Chevrolet Powerglide, Chevrolet Turboglide, and Buick Flight Pitch Dynaflow and Triple Turbine transmissions. On January 16, 1941, Kelley gave an illustrated slide talk on the Hydra-Matic transmission at a meeting of the Detroit chapter of the American Society of Tool Engineers, sponsored by General Motors' Detroit Transmission Division; W. L. Carnegie spoke on the history of the project.

== Awards ==
- Recipient of a Citation at the awarding of Earl A. Thompson with the Elmer A. Sperry Award in 1963 for his part in the design and development of the first successful automatic automobile transmission. The Society of Automotive Engineers honored Thompson, Kelley and the four other team members at a luncheon in Detroit on January 15, 1964.

== Automatic Transmission Patents ==
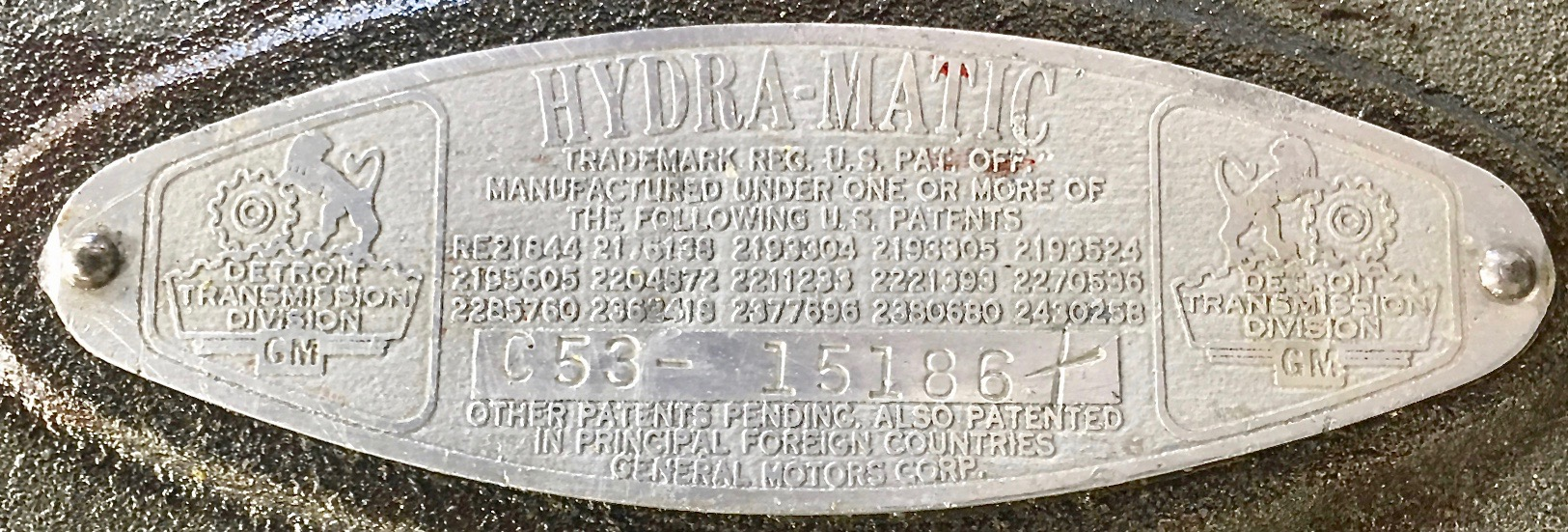
The identification tag of a 1953 Hydra-Matic Transmission showing 15 patents; three were Kelley's

- At his retirement in 1967, Kelley held 115 patents, 82 in his own name and 33 with co-inventors, and had been cited by the Michigan Patent Law Association as one of the 60 outstanding inventors in Michigan. The Flint Journal reported that his total was the highest of any GM engineer then employed and the third highest in GM history. His U.S. and Canadian patents, issued from 1929 to 1971, relate to fluid couplings, torque converters and transmission designs. Barr said Kelley "had over 100 patents" and called him "a very innovative, creative engineer".
1. 1937/1939 US Patent US2176138 for Combination fluid turbo clutch and variable speed gearing
2. 1939/1940 US Patent US2211233 for Fluid flywheel gearing arrangement
3. 1941/1945 US Patent US2377696 for Transmission drive
- Kelley also published several SAE Technical Documents on fluid couplings, torque converters, and planetary gear set design.
