= Antony Jameson =

British aerospace engineer (1934–2026)

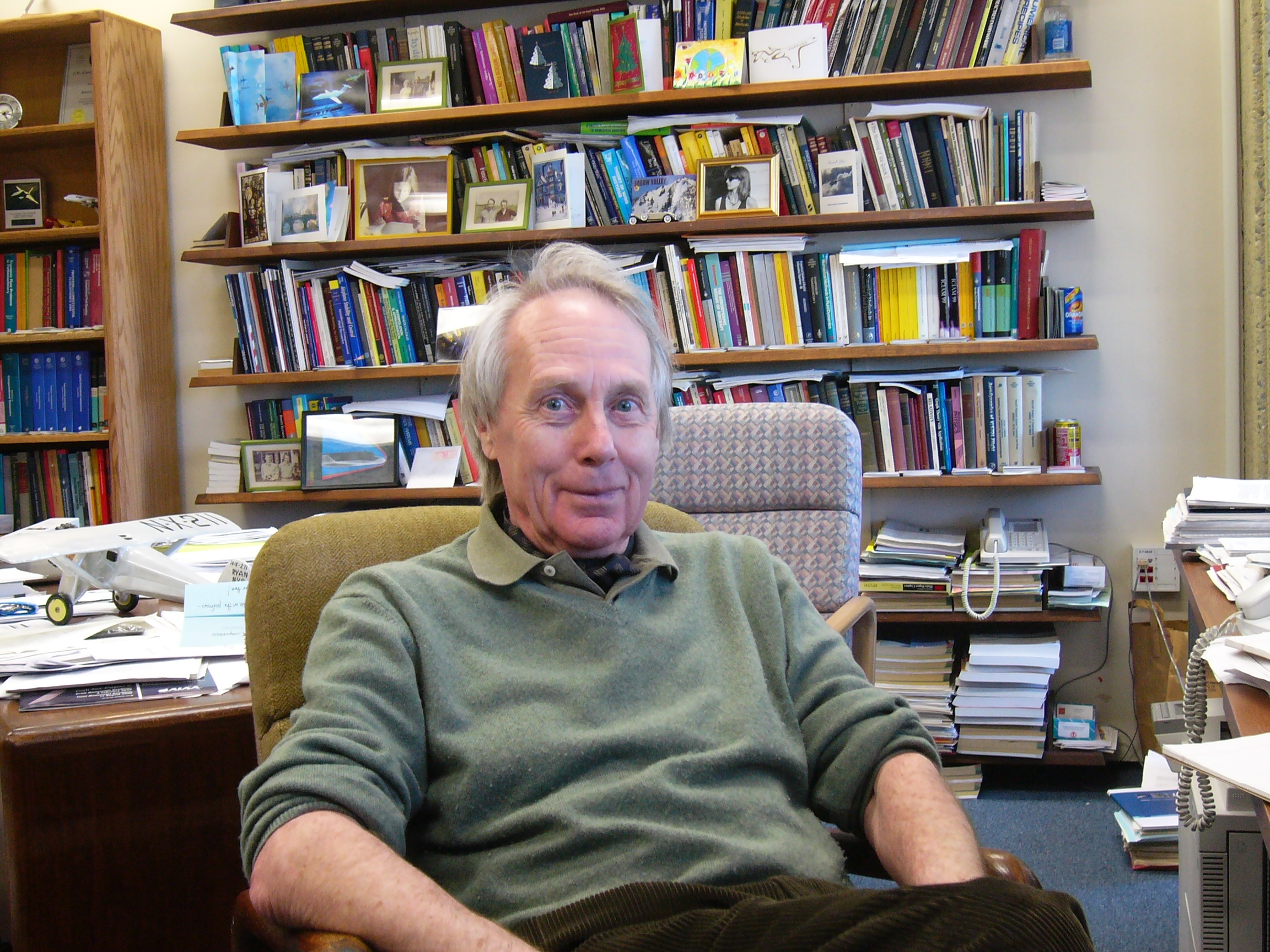
- Jameson in 2008
- Born: 20 November 1934; Gillingham, Kent, England
- Died: 11 June 2026 (aged 91); Bryan, Texas, US
- Education: University of Cambridge (BA, PhD)
- Known for: Jameson–Schmidt–Turkel scheme; Jameson's theorem
- Awards: Daniel Guggenheim Medal (2015); Elmer A. Sperry Award (2006); Fellow of the Royal Academy of Engineering (2005); International Member of the National Academy of Engineering (1997); Fellow of the Royal Society (1995)
- Scientific career
- Fields: Computational fluid dynamics; Control theory; Transonic flow
- Workplaces: Texas A&M University; Stanford University; Princeton University; New York University

Guy Antony Jameson FRS FREng FRAeS (20 November 1934 – 11 June 2026) was a British-born scientist best known for his contributions to computational fluid dynamics. He was a professor of aerospace engineering at Texas A&M University and had published over 400 papers on aerospace science, including computational fluid dynamics, control theory, and aerodynamics.

Born in the United Kingdom, Jameson led a career in industry and higher education between the UK and US. He was elected a fellow of the Royal Society in 1995, an international member of the National Academy of Engineering (US) in 1997, and a fellow of the Royal Academy of Engineering in 2005 for his work in magnetohydrodynamics and control theory, which was applied in the aircraft industry internationally.

== Life and career ==
=== Early life ===
Guy Antony Jameson was born in Gillingham, Kent, on 20 November 1934, to Oscar Jameson and Olive Jameson (née Turney). He spent much of his early childhood in India, where his father was stationed as an officer in the British Army. Jameson first attended school at St. Edward's School in Simla. He was later educated at the Mowden School and at Winchester College.

As a lieutenant in the British Army from 1953 to 1955, Jameson was sent to Malaya. After leaving the army, he worked in the compressor design section of Bristol Aero-Engines for the summer of 1955 before studying engineering at Trinity Hall, Cambridge. Jameson graduated with first class honours in 1958. He subsequently stayed at Trinity Hall as a research fellow from 1960 to 1963 while obtaining his PhD in magnetohydrodynamics.

=== Economist and engineer in the UK ===
On completing his doctorate at Cambridge, he worked as an economist for the Trades Union Congress from 1964 to 1965. He then became the chief mathematician at Hawker Siddeley's Dynamics Missile Division in Coventry, where he worked from 1965 to 1966.

=== Engineering and research in the US ===
Moving to the United States in 1966, Jameson joined the Aerodynamics Section of Grumman Aerospace in Bethpage, New York. His work was initially focused on the application of optimal control theory to the design of stability augmentation systems. He devised a new method to solve the Sylvester equation, which has later been cited as "Jameson's theorem".

=== Higher education ===
In 1970, Jameson began to concentrate on predicting transonic flow, and in 1972 he became a research scientist at the Courant Institute of Mathematical Sciences at New York University, where he continued this work. He was an associate professor of mathematics at the university in 1973 and became a professor of computer science in 1974.

Jameson was appointed a professor of mechanical and aerospace engineering at Princeton University in 1980, and was named James S. McDonnell Distinguished University Professor in 1982, a professorship endowed by the James S. McDonnell Foundation. He held that role until 1997, when he moved to Stanford University and became a professor emeritus at Princeton.

At Stanford, Jameson was Thomas V. Jones Professor of Engineering from 1997 to 2014 and a research professor from 2015 to 2017. He became a professor emeritus in 2018, when he joined Texas A&M University. At Texas A&M, he was a professor of aerospace engineering and of ocean engineering. Since 2020, he has additionally held the Jack E. & Frances Brown Chair in Engineering I, succeeding Kenneth R. Hall in the position.

=== Death ===
Jameson died at St. Joseph's Hospital in Bryan, Texas, on 11 June 2026, aged 91.

== Research ==
=== Background ===
By 1960, the principles of fluid dynamics were well established and formulation of the governing equations (namely potential flow, Euler equations, and Reynolds-averaged Navier–Stokes equations) was understood. With the emergence of more powerful computers, new algorithms were required in order to use computers in finding numerical solutions.

=== Contributions ===
Jameson was widely considered a pioneer in the field of computational fluid dynamics. Jameson, alongside Wolfgang Schmidt and Eli Turkel, introduced what is now the Jameson–Schmidt–Turkel (JST) scheme in 1981 as a step in research to find solutions to the Euler equations. The JST scheme is a Runge–Kutta numerical algorithm for the Euler and Navier–Stokes equations. Jameson was also the first to produce an inviscid solution for a complete aircraft.

Through his research, Jameson devised novel schemes for solving the Euler and Navier–Stokes equations for various flow problems, including multigrid methods for steady flow problems and dual time stepping schemes for unsteady flow. In 1985, he achieved "the first Euler calculation of the flow past a complete aircraft".

Beginning in 1970, he also wrote and developed the "FLO" and "SYN" series of codes, codes used throughout the aerospace industry to design aircraft. According to peers in the field of computational fluid dynamics, the "Jameson style" of writing codes is recognizably clear and legible. The FLO and SYN codes led to seminal multigrid finite volume methods to solving equations. Jameson's software implementations, including the FLO and SYN Fortran codes, advanced the state of aerodynamic design optimisation, as the codes were used by Airbus, Boeing, Bombardier, Embraer, and others.

== Awards ==
Jameson was elected to several national and international academies, including the Royal Society in 1995, National Academy of Engineering in 1997, and Royal Academy of Engineering in 2005. His fellowships in professional societies included election as a fellow of the Royal Aeronautical Society in 2004 and as an honorary fellow of the American Institute of Aeronautics and Astronautics in 2018.

For his work on transonic potential flow, Jameson was given the NASA Exceptional Scientific Achievement Medal in 1980, which is awarded for "an unusually significant scientific contribution toward achievement of NASA's mission". In 1988, he was awarded the Gold Medal of the Royal Aeronautical Society.

The American Society of Mechanical Engineers awarded Jameson the 1995 Spirit of St. Louis Medal for "meritorious service in the advancement of aeronautics and astronautics", specifically his "contributions to computational fluid dynamics and for the development of many widely used computer programs that have immeasurably improved understanding of complex flow fields". The Elmer A. Sperry Board of Award, composed of six professional societies, awarded Jameson their 2006 Elmer A. Sperry Award "in recognition of his seminal and continuing contributions to the modern design of aircraft".

In 2015, the American Institute of Aeronautics and Astronautics awarded Jameson both the Daniel Guggenheim Medal "for exceptional contributions to algorithmic innovation and the development of computational fluid dynamic codes" and the Pendray Aerospace Literature Award "for seminal and high-impact research papers in the field of computational fluid dynamics and aerodynamic optimization". That same year, he won the John von Neumann Medal, the highest award of the U.S. Association for Computational Mechanics.
