= Momentum curtain =

Discovered by British engineer Christopher Cockerell, the momentum curtain is a unique and efficient way to reduce friction between a vehicle and its surface of travel, be it water or land, by levitating the vehicle above this surface via a cushion of air. It is this principle of levitation upon which a hovercraft is based, and Christopher Cockerell set about applying his momentum curtain theory to hovercraft to increase their abilities in overcoming friction in travel.

Levitating a vehicle above the ground/water to reduce its drag was not a new concept. John Thornycroft, in 1877, discovered that trapping air beneath a ship's hull, or pumping air beneath it with bellows, decreased the effects of friction upon the hull thereby increasing the ship's top attainable speeds. However, technology at the time was insufficient for Thornycroft's ideas to be developed further.

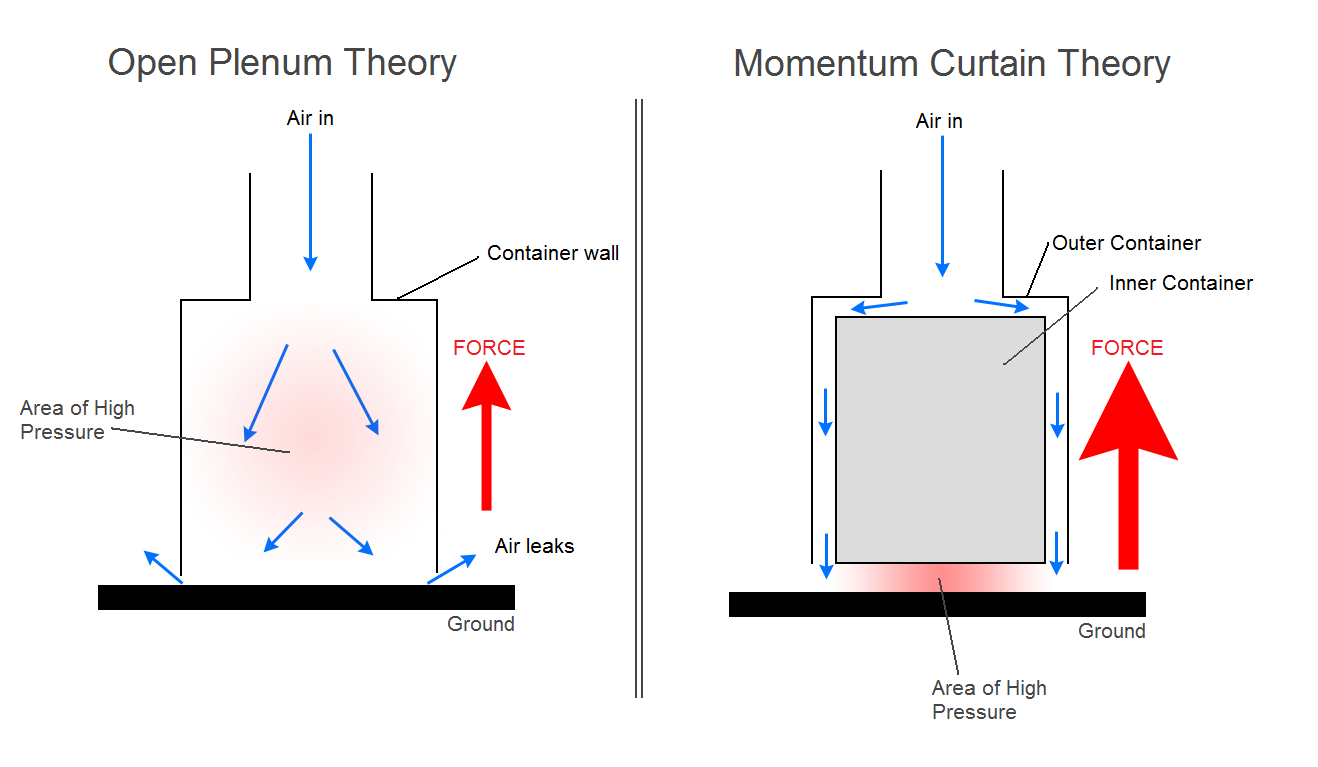
Open Plenum vs. Momentum Curtain

Cockerell used the idea of pumped air under a hull (this then becoming a plenum, i.e. the opposite of a vacuum) and improved upon it further. Simply pumping air between a hull and the ground wasted a lot of energy in terms of leakage of air around the edges of the hull. Cockerell discovered that by means of generating a wall (curtain) of high-speed downward-directed air around the edges of a hull, that less air leaked out from the sides (due to the momentum of the high-speed air molecules), and thus a greater pressure could be attained beneath the hull. So, with the same input power, a greater amount of lift could be developed, and the hull could be lifted higher above the surface, reducing friction and increasing clearance. This theory was tried, tested and developed throughout the 1950s and 1960s until it was finally realised in full-scale in the SR-N1 hovercraft.
