= Bruno Murari =

Italian inventor (born 1936)

- Born: 1936 (age 89–90); Treviso, Italy
- Occupation: Electronics engineer
- Known for: Integrated circuits developer
- Children: 2
- Awards: Elmer A. Sperry Award (2017)

Bruno Murari (born 14 May 1936) is an Italian inventor. During his career, he has patented about 200 inventions in the field of circuit design, power technologies and MEMS (Micro Electro Mechanical Systems) devices. He is the only Italian to have received the Elmer A. Sperry Award, which is awarded to those who have distinguished themselves with proven engineering contributions to advance the field of transport. He was defined "legendary analog engineer" and "father" of the BCD technology.

== Early years ==
Murari grew up in Venice, on the island of San Giorgio and, after earning a diploma in electrical engineering, in 1955 at the Technical Institute "A. Pacinotti" in Mestre, he began working for Edison Volta, for which he designed substations and power lines in Val Camonica.

In 1961, he was hired at the Somiren (Nuclear Energy Radioactive Minerals Society) of San Donato Milanese, a small company of the Agip Nuclear group. After work, he attended evening classes at the Aurelio Beltrami Radiotechnical Institute and obtained an electronic expert's diploma two years later.

== STMicroelectronics ==
In November 1961, Murari transferred to SGS (General semiconductor company) of Agrate Brianza, today STMicroelectronics, a startup founded by Adriano Olivetti and Virgilio Floriani, founder of Telettra, first at the Applications Laboratory and then in the linear integrated circuits design group. Thanks to the partnership with the semiconductor company Fairchild Semiconductor, he began collaborating with Bob Widlar, one of the pioneers of integrated circuit design.

At the end of the 1960s, he developed the first audio amplifier integrated circuit for TVs and portable radios. Then he adapted the technology for integrated circuits, initially developed in the consumer electronics field, to the automotive market, obtaining the first voltage regulator with a metal casing for automotive alternators, made with the STMicroelectronics bipolar process.

In 1972, he took on responsibility for the design of linear integrated circuits and in 1981, he became Director of the Research Laboratories of Cornaredo, whose mission was to develop technologies regarding high voltage integrated circuits.

Since 1998 Murari has begun the development of technologies and some MEMS devices (Micro Electro-Mechanical Systems), such as pressure transducers and multiaxial accelerometers, which have been used in video games, in smartphones and in numerous technological products.

== Works ==
- Murari, B. (Bruno); Bertotti, F. (Franco); Vignola, G. A. (Giovanni A.) (1996). Smart Power ICs : technologies and applications. Springer. ISBN 3540603328. OCLC 34513152.
- IEEE Industrial Electronics Society.; American Society of Mechanical Engineers. Dynamic Systems and Control Division.; IEEE Robotics and Automation Society. (2001). 2001 IEEE/ASME International Conference on Advanced Intelligent Mechatronics : proceedings : 8-12 July, 2001, Teatro Sociale, Como, Italy. IEEE. ISBN 0780367367. OCLC 48891717.
- IEEE, Electron Devices Society Staff (1995). 1995 International Electron Devices Meeting. IEEE. ISBN 9780780327009. OCLC 812632708.
- Institute of Electrical and Electronics Engineers.; IEEE Electron Devices Society. (2003). Transducers '03 : the 12th International Conference on Solid-State Sensors, Actuators and Microsystems : digest of technical papers : [June 9-12, 2003], Boston. IEEE. ISBN 0780377311. OCLC 812614177.
- Institute of Electrical and Electronics Engineers.; University of Pennsylvania. (2003). 2003 IEEE International Solid-State Circuits Conference : digest of technical papers : ISSCC 1954-2003 (1st ed.). IEEE. ISBN 0780377079. OCLC 53457374.

== Achievements ==
In his career, Murari personally designed 10 integrated circuits, directed the development of over 2,000 integrated circuits and obtained more than 200 patents in the field of circuit design, power technologies and MEMS devices. He is considered the "father" of the BCD technology (Bipolar-CMOS-DMOS), which integrates bipolar technology for analog circuits, CMOS technology for control and digital logic and robust power components DMOS at high voltage. The resulting processes enabled the development of new applications in different areas, such as the automotive industry (and subsequent vehicle electrification; electronic engine control, replacement of mechanically controlled ignition systems with electronic modules), hard drives, starter for discharge lamps and high-powered car stereo systems.

== Awards ==
- 1993: finalist for the "EDN Innovator of the Year" award
- 1995, Honorary degree, Ca' Foscari University of Venice
- 1995: European SEMI Award
- 2002, Honorary degree, Polytechnic University of Milan
- 2011: Sapio Award for the industry
- 2014: Lifetime Achievement Award from the MEMS and Sensors Industry Group
- 2017: Elmer A. Sperry Award for being among the first to understand that silicon has not only extraordinary electrical properties but also unique physical and mechanical properties and for its contributions to the development of the first integrated circuit audio amplifiers for TVs and portable radios for SGS (General Semiconductor Company).

== Personal life ==
Bruno Murari is married, with two children. He is passionate about free-flying model aircraft.
