= Tandanor =

Argentine shipyard

Coordinates: 34°37′34″S 58°21′01″W

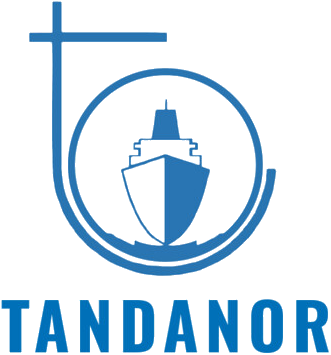

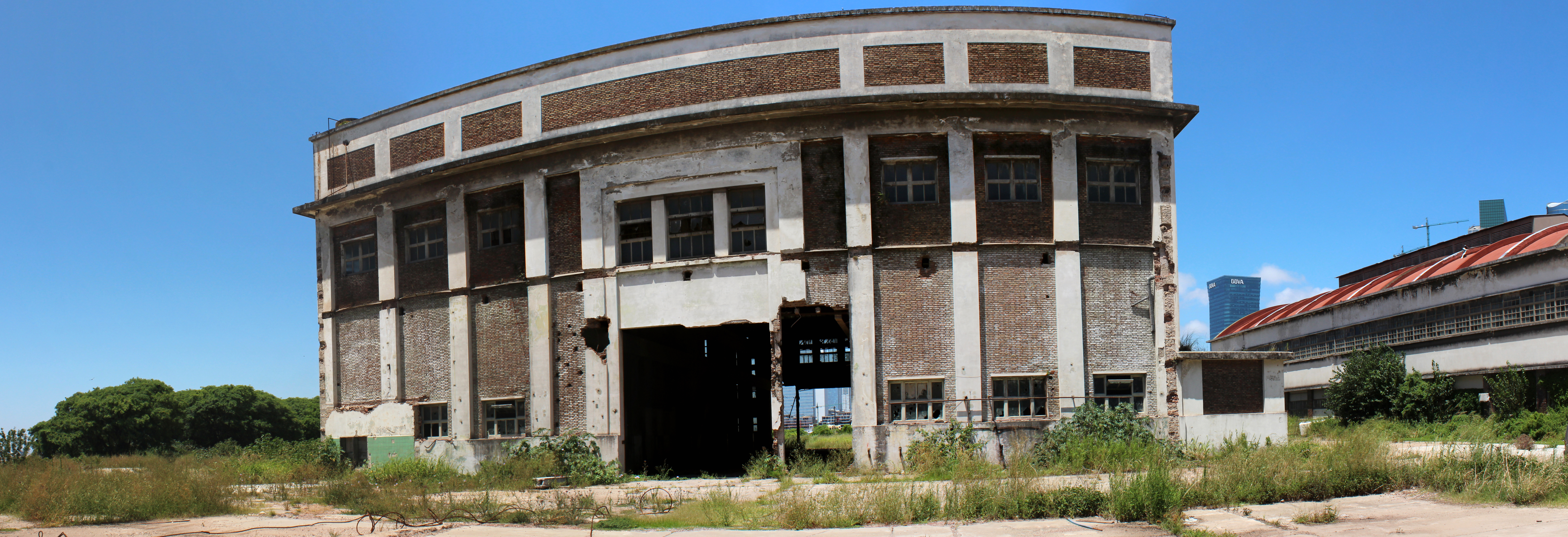
- Tandanor shipyard in Puerto Madero
- Native name: Talleres Navales Dársena Norte
- Company type: S.A.
- Industry: Naval
- Founded: 1879; 147 years ago as "Talleres Navales de Marina"
- Founder: Nicolás Avellaneda
- Headquarters: Buenos Aires, Argentina
- Area served: Argentina
- Key people: Miguel Angel Tudino, President
- Owner: Government of Argentina (90% share); Company workers (10%)
- Parent: Ministry of Defense
- Website: tandanor.com.ar

Tandanor (an acronym for Talleres Navales Dársena Norte, Naval Workshops North Dock) is an Argentine shipyard located south of Buenos Aires port, which, together with Almirante Storni yard constitutes CINAR (Argentina's Industrial and Naval Compound) dedicated to shipbuilding and ship repair.

The port now accommodates vessels from around the globe owing to its international prominence. Its competitive advantage springs from its Syncrolift: a ship lifting platform that allows vessels to be dry docked and perform simultaneous repairs on its six slipways. In April 2019, Tandanor signed a cooperation agreement with City Bank.

== History ==
The company was established as "Talleres Navales de Marina" on November 10, 1879, during the presidency of Nicolás Avellaneda for the maintenance of Navy of Argentina ships. In 1922, it was renamed "Arsenal Naval Buenos Aires", then establishing as a "sociedad anónima" under its current denomination, with majority of state-capital injection in 1971.

The recently formed S.A. was created in order to supply the merchant fleet and assist with maintenance tasks. It was directed by the Argentine Navy and the National Ports Administration together. The company added workships and two docks to its operational base.

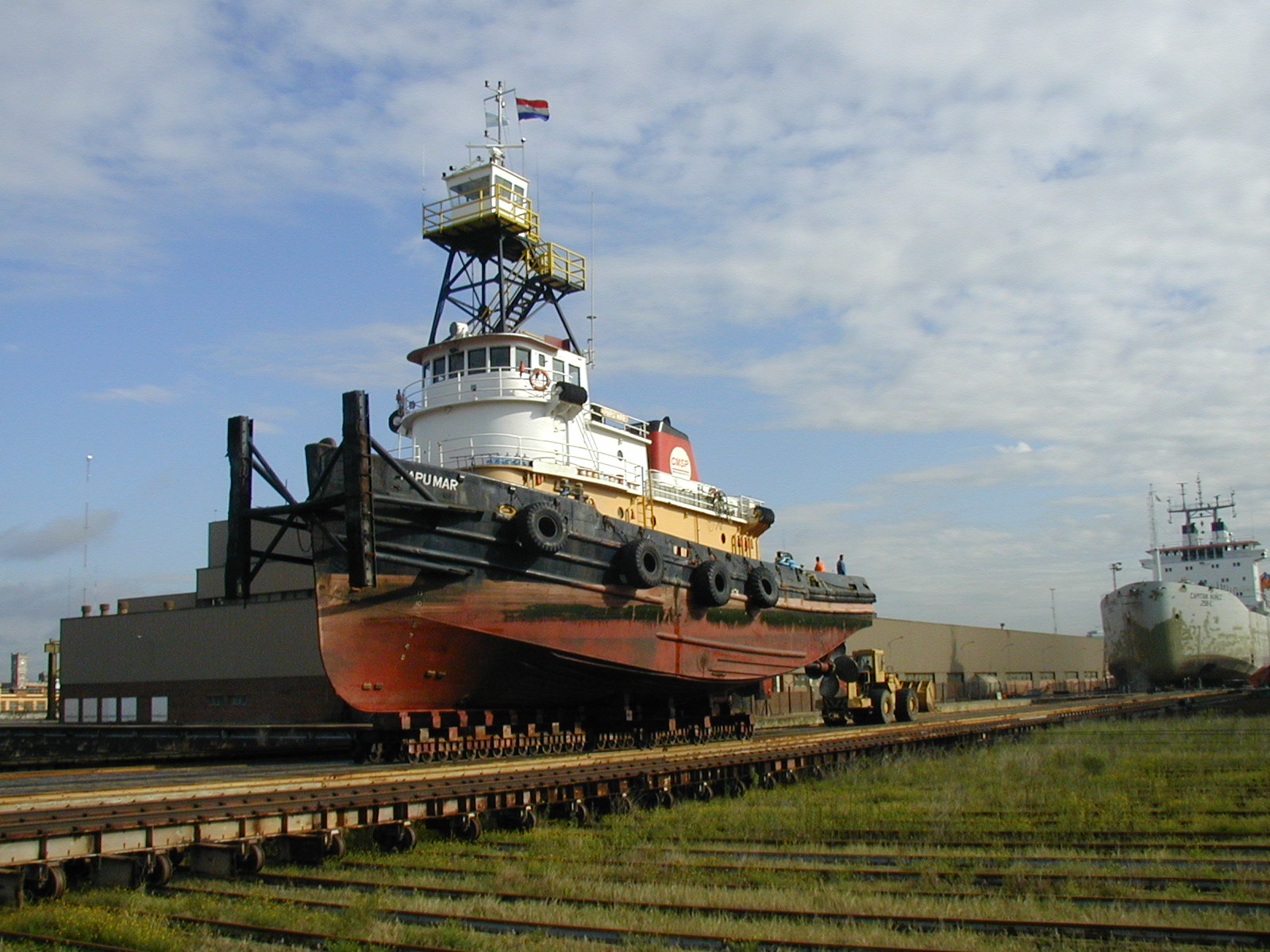
Synchrolift transfer platform, October 2007

By 1943, Tandanor had more than 6,000 specialised workers. The increased demand of engineers resulted in the creation of the career of Naval Engineering, established by the University of Buenos Aires in 1950, as well as several training programs were also established. During those times the ARA Libertad frigate was constructed as a school ship of the Navy.

In 1973, the Navy sent personnel of TARENA (another shipyard) to work at Tandanor, also giving it new facilities. By those times the company had eight docks and needed to expand its business due to the increasing activity at the Atlantic Ocean. Five years later, Pearlson Engineering of Miami, US, was commissioned to build an elevator "Syncrolift". Tandanor was privatised in 1991 as part of the economy politics of then president Carlos Menem. The company was declared bankrupt in 1999.

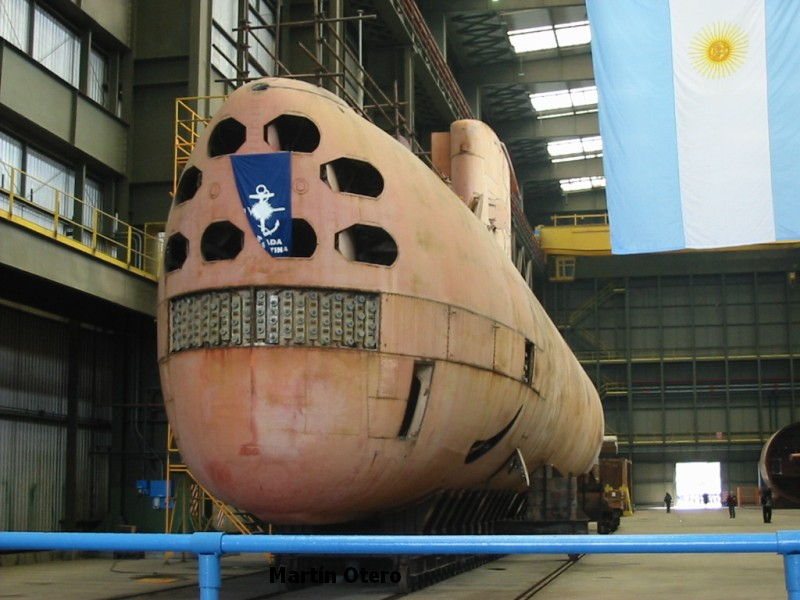
Submarine Type 209-1200 ARA San Luis in Almirante Storni shipyard

The company was nationalised through a decree by president Néstor Kirchner in March 2007, declaring null all the previous process. As compensation for their efforts to carry out the company during last years, workers of Tandanor received 10% of the company, leaving the 90% as state-owned.

== See also ==
- Argentine defense industry
