= National Research Development Corporation =

Former government body in the UK

The National Research Development Corporation (NRDC) was a non-departmental government body established by the British Government to transfer technology from the public sector to the private sector.

The NRDC provided financial support for various development programmes. Computing was a key area that the organisation sought to support; amongst others acts, it supported the Ferranti Mark 1, the world's first commercially available electronic general-purpose stored-program digital computer. One high-profile application involving NRDC was the development of hovercraft, which was worked on under a contract issued by the organisation to Saunders-Roe.

== History ==
The NRDC was established by Attlee's Labour government in 1948 to meet a perceived need at the time to exploit the many products that had been developed during World War II by the Defence Research Establishments. It was set up by the Board of Trade under the Development of Inventions Act 1948 and the first managing director was Lord Giffard. In terms of its day-to-day management, the NRDC operated independently of the British government.

By 1963, the NRDC was reportedly assessing roughly one thousand inventions annually. While several early projects that it supported ultimately proved to be a loss, the NRDC was able to achieve an overall net surplus of nearly £2,300,000 across a 25 year period, while more than half of its individual projects generated a surplus.

In 1981, the NRDC was combined with the National Enterprise Board ('NEB') to form the British Technology Group ('BTG').

== Operations ==
Typically, the NRDC would patent the product for commercial exploitation and earn royalties as private sector companies generated sales from those products. Examples of such products include carbon fibre, asbestos-plastic composites and developments in semi-conductor technology. By the end of 1949, the NRDC held around 40 patents in the field of computing alone; this increased to more than 2,000 by 1957. In the early 1950s, the NRDC conduced it first licensing arrangement with the American firm IBM, which was reportedly garnered profits from American companies.

The development of Britain's computing sector was a critical priority for the organisation throughout the 1950s and 1960s. In 1951, the NRDC placed its first contract related to the computer industry, which involved an investment of £400,000 between the British engineering firm Ferranti and Manchester University; this led to the deployment of the Ferranti Mark 1, the world's first commercially available electronic general-purpose stored-program digital computer. Similar arrangements were made with other companies, such as Elliott Brothers. In 1954 alone, £325,000 out of the NRDC's £928,000 budget was allocated to computers. In the 1960s, increasingly large sums were allocated towards the sector in line with its growing importance.

During the late 1950s, the British aerospace company Saunders-Roe was seeking backing to develop the SR.N1, the first practical hovercraft. After the Ministry of Defence became unable to finance further development; the NRDC was approached by the company. On 17 April 1958, the inventor Christopher Cockerell met with the NRDC to present his vehicle; Lord Giffard was so impressed that he opted to take immediate action. One day later, the NRDC board confirmed its decision to support the project, subsequently noting that it would be the organisation's biggest project to date. The NRDC promptly issued Saunders-Roe with a contract and authorisation to proceed. In 1959, a specialised subsidiary of the NDRC, named Hovercraft Development Limited (HDL), for which Cockerell was appointed as technical director to handle the contract with Sauders-Roe and built up a patent portfolio. In spite of the design process being officially led by Chaplin and Cockerell's position at HDL, the latter continued to be heavily involvement in the design work.

In the 1970s, a team of Rothamsted Research scientists discovered three pyrethroids suitable for use as insecticides, namely permethrin, cypermethrin and deltamethrin. These compounds were subsequently licensed as NRDC 143, 149 and 161 respectively, to companies which then manufactured them for use worldwide.

== List of chairmen ==
- 1950–1955: Percy Mills, 1st Viscount Mills
- 1955–1957: Sir Alan Arthur Saunders
- 1957–1969: William Black, Baron Black
- 1969–1979: Frank Schon, Baron Schon

== See also ==
- Alvey
- Minister of Technology
- National Enterprise Board
