= Edward J. Wasp =

American engineer and inventor

- Born: June 6, 1923; New York City, New York, U.S.
- Died: August 31, 2015; San Rafael, California, U.S.
- Education: Cooper Union, University of Pittsburgh, New York University, Golden Gate University
- Occupation: Engineer
- Engineering career
- Institutions: American Institute of Chemical Engineers
- Employer(s): Bechtel, Energy Transportation Systems, Inc. (ETSI), Consolidation Coal
- Awards: Elmer A. Sperry Award (1981)

Edward J. Wasp (1923–2015), also known as E. J. Wasp, was an American engineer and inventor who developed long distance slurry pipelines for the transportation of coal and other solid materials. Wasp, born in New York City, earned a bachelor's degree in chemical engineering from Cooper Union, a master's degree in mathematics from the University of Pittsburgh, and an MBA from Golden Gate University. He began experimenting with coal slurries in a systematic manner when he worked for Consolidation Coal Company in the early 1950s. Wasp combined works of scientists and engineers and developed a model that related homogeneous and heterogeneous "flow characteristics" of slurry for the design of long-distance pipelines. He was in charge of the world's first long-distance coal pipeline, a 108-mile system within Ohio completed in 1957.

Wasp later became manager of the slurry systems department for the engineering firm Bechtel and executive vice president of Energy Transportation Systems, Inc. (ETSI). He received an Elmer A. Sperry Award in 1981 "for his contributions toward the development and application of long distance pipeline slurry transport of coal and other finely divided solid materials". In 1982, Pipeline called Wasp the "patron saint of slurry pipelines" and one of the leading slurry pipeline engineers in the world.

== Early life and education ==
Edward Wasp was born in New York City. He earned a bachelor's degree in chemical engineering from Cooper Union. He later obtained master's degrees in mathematics from the University of Pittsburgh and chemical engineering from New York University, as well as an MBA from Golden Gate University in San Francisco.

== Career ==
Models and patents for the hydraulic transportation of solids were issued prior to the twentieth century. However, modern slurry pipeline development began in the early 1950s when Wasp worked for Consolidation Coal Company and experimented with coal slurries in a systematic manner. By combining works of scientists and engineers, Wasp developed a model that related homogeneous and heterogeneous "flow characteristics" of slurry for the design of long-distance pipelines. Wasp discovered that understanding slurry properties was more important than developing "exotic materials or special equipment"; this allowed conventional construction techniques already utilized within the oil and gas industries. As manager of process engineering and development, he was in charge of the world's first long-distance coal pipeline. The 108-mile system was completed in 1957 and transported coal slurry from mines in southeastern Ohio to a power plant located near Cleveland.

Wasp then became manager of the slurry systems department for the San Francisco-based engineering firm Bechtel. In this position Wasp developed, designed and implemented all slurry pipelines and process projects, including the Savage River iron ore pipeline in Tasmania, the Calaveras limestone pipeline in California, the Waipipi iron pipeline in New Zealand and the Black Mesa coal pipeline in Arizona. Wasp eventually became executive vice president of Energy Transportation Systems, Inc. (ETSI). In 1982, Pipeline called Wasp the "patron saint of slurry pipelines" and one of the leading slurry pipeline engineers in the world. At that time he was working with state officials and contractors in an effort to construct a slurry pipeline between Wyoming and Louisiana.

Wasp has been granted at least twenty patents, most of which are related to slurry pipelines. He has authored more than thirty articles about slurry pipelines and published the book Solid Liquid Flow-Slurry Pipeline Transportation (1977). Wasp has been a member of the American Institute of Chemical Engineers and held engineering licenses in California and Wyoming.

== Recognitions ==
In 1981, Wasp received the Elmer A. Sperry Award "for his contributions toward the development and application of long distance pipeline slurry transport of coal and other finely divided solid materials". The award, given in recognition of a "distinguished engineering contribution to the art of transportation", was presented at the November 1981 Honors Assembly of the American Society of Mechanical Engineers in Washington, D.C.

== See also ==
- Coal mining
- History of coal mining
- List of chemical engineers
