= Travel lift =

Specialized crane used to transport boats around marinas

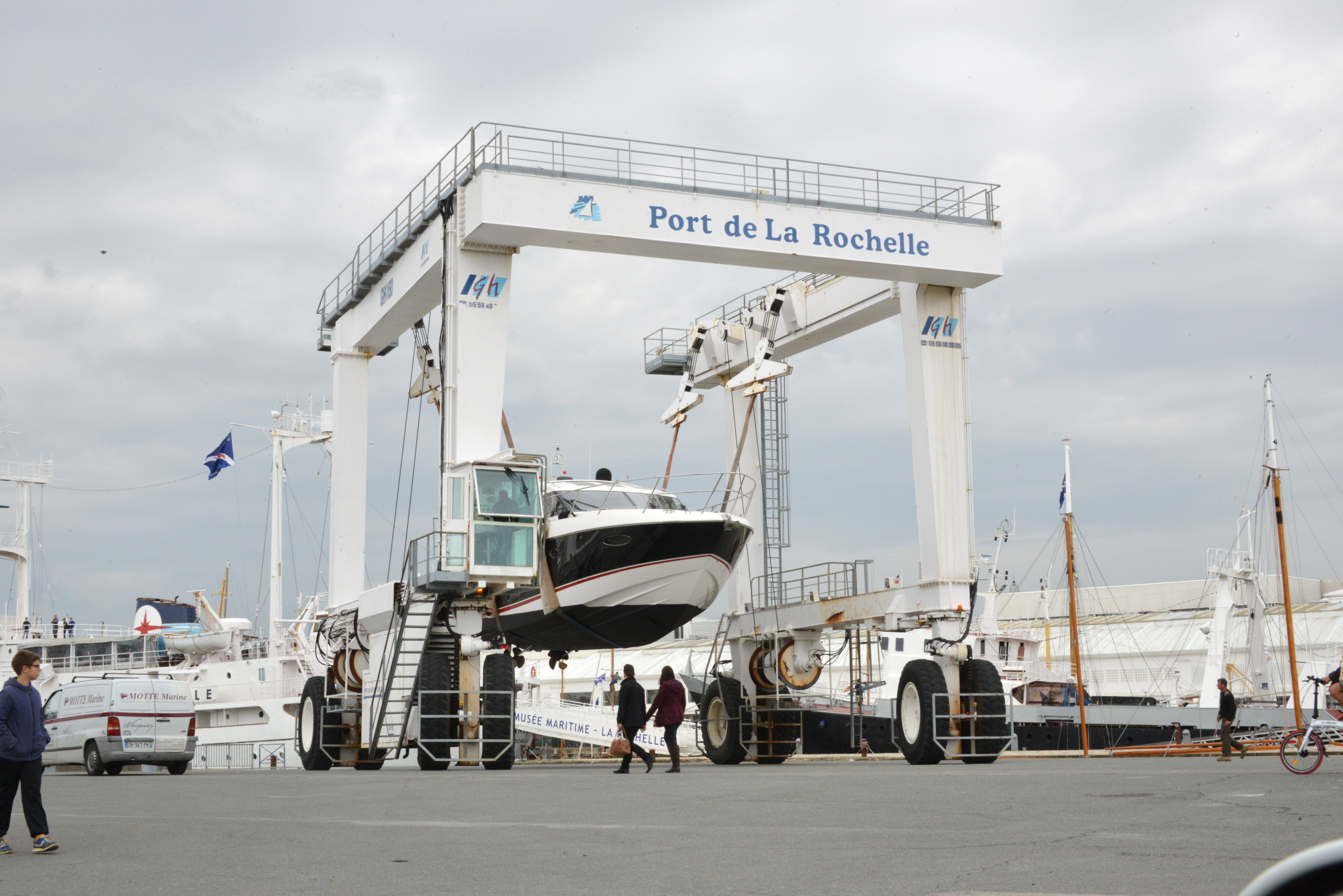
A small motor-boat lifted from the water by a travel lift at La Rochelle, France, 2016

A travel lift or travelift (also called a boat hoist, boat gantry crane, or boat crane) is a specialised type of crane used for lifting boats out of the water and transporting them around docks or marinas. These cranes allow boats with masts or tall superstructure to be transported around hard stands as the tall upper structure can pass through the open end of the crane framework before lifting and after setting down.

Travel lifts typically have two rectangular side frames joined by a beam across one end. The lift is mobile with four groups of steerable wheels, one at each corner. Boats are typically lifted using straps, slung between the two sides which can be passed under boats when either in the water or on the hard stand. Steel wire cables on winches are used to lift the boat.

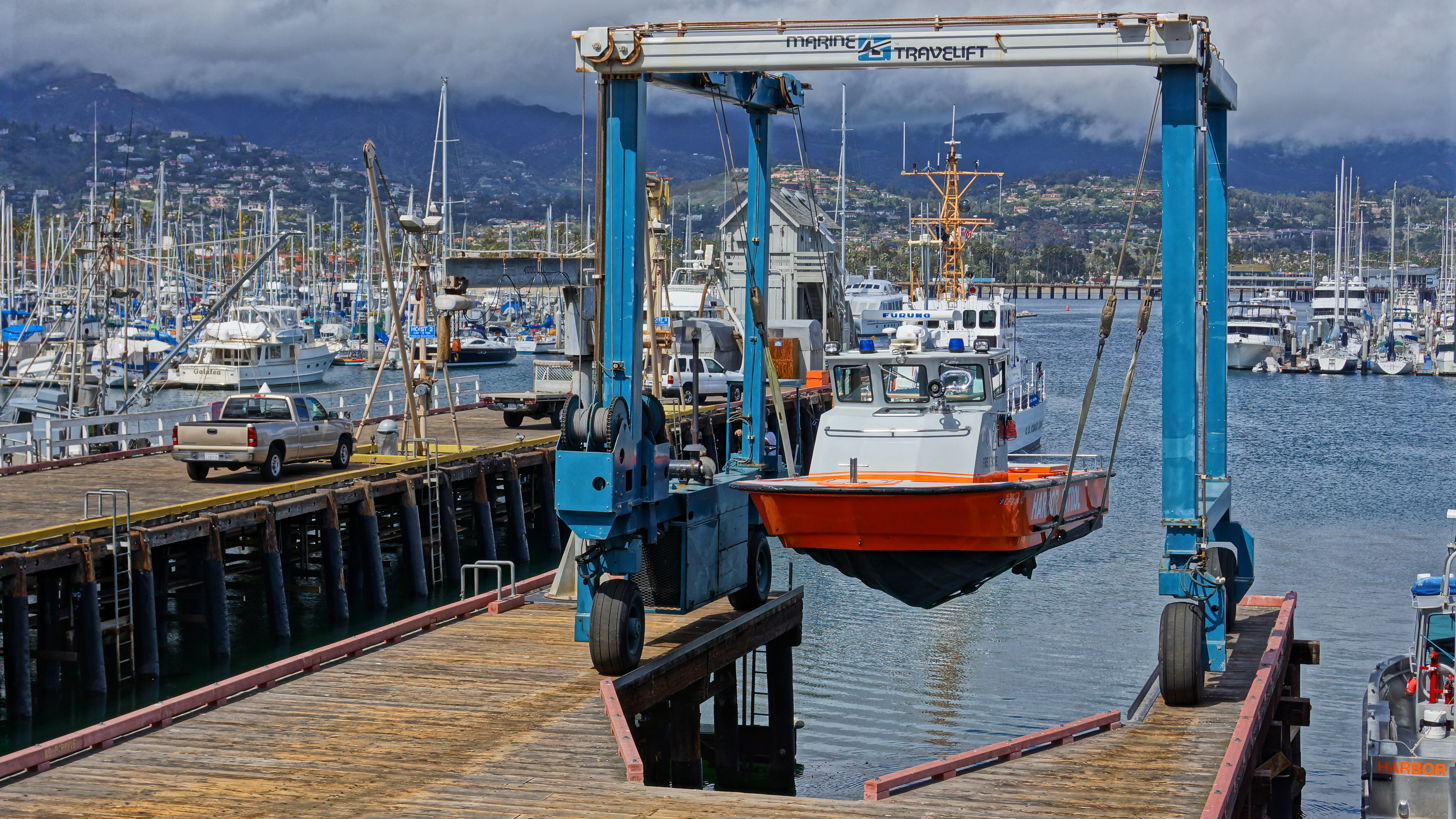
A lifting well and travel lift at Santa Barbara Harbor, California

To remove a boat from the water, two basic methods may be used. In one, the boat is positioned in a narrow dock, or lifting well, with two paths along each side, which are at the same level as the hard stand. The travel lift can then be driven onto the paths so that it is positioned over the boat. The boat can then be lifted above the level of the hard stand and driven around to the place where it is to be lowered. The other method requires the travel lift to be run down a slipway with a shallow slope, until it is deep enough for the boat to be floated between the sides, the slings rigged, and the boat lifted sufficiently to be sure of clearing the slipway surface when the lift is winched, driven, or towed out.

Travel lifts can have a variety of lifting capacities from tens of tonnes used for small boats to well over 1000 tonnes which can be used for sizeable ships. They typically lift loads at around 1 metre per minute (3 ft/min) and can be driven at speeds of up to 40 metres per minute (130 ft/min).

Boats need to be removed from the water for a variety of reasons including anti-fouling and removal of marine growth, maintenance and inspection, repair, and long term storage. Because of their slow speeds, marine travel lifts are impractical for street transport of boats.

There is also an amphibious version that can be lift the boat directly from the sea.

== See also ==
- Gantry crane – Type of overhead crane used in industrial environments
- Syncrolift – Supplier of ship-handling equipment for shipyards
