= Portable boat lift =

A portable boat lift is a tool designed specifically to allow one person to transport, set up, and safely separate boats from boat trailers. Portable boat lifts are intended to be used on land, rather than near, in, or on the water. Sometimes referred to as a boat hoist, this equipment holds the watercraft out of the water so that maintenance and repairs can be performed. Portable boat lifts may differ in design, cost, weight, and function but they are by definition portable. Portable boat lifts are relatively new to the boating industry.

A portable boat lift is different from a gantry crane, fork lift with elongated forks, or machine, none of which can be easily transported from location to location. A portable boat lift is not a boat lift which is commonly found attached to a dock. Although some devices allow one person to separate a boat from a trailer or lift a boat up and out of the water, they are not by definition portable. The term "boat lift" originally referred to lift locks. In modern usage the term "boat lift," as opposed to "portable boat lift," usually refers to devices permanently installed at a dock to simply lift a boat above the water, a type of ship lift. It is not specifically designed for separating a boat from a trailer.

Prior to the introduction of portable boat lifts, boat lifting work could only be performed at shops or locations that had access to cranes, machines, forklifts, or similar lifting equipment. Portable lifts allow individuals, professional boat and boat trailer mechanics, boat and boat trailer painters or anyone needing to separate a boat from a trailer the ability to perform the work by themselves away from a shop.
