= Elmer A. Sperry Award =

The Elmer A. Sperry Award, named after the inventor and entrepreneur, is an American transportation engineering prize.

It has been given since 1955 for "a distinguished engineering contribution which, through application, proved in actual service, has advanced the art of transportation whether by land, sea, air, or space." The prize is given jointly by the American Institute of Aeronautics and Astronautics, Institute of Electrical and Electronics Engineers, Society of Automotive Engineers, Society of Naval Architects and Marine Engineers, American Society of Civil Engineers, and the American Society of Mechanical Engineers (which administers it). The purpose of the award is to encourage progress in the engineering of transportation.

== Recipients ==
Source: Elmer A. Sperry award

- 1955 William Francis Gibbs, for the development of the SS United States
- 1956 Donald W. Douglas, for the DC series of air transport planes
- 1957 Harold L. Hamilton, Richard M. Dilworth and Eugene W. Kettering, for developing the diesel-electric locomotive
- 1958 Ferdinand Porsche (in memoriam) and Heinz Nordhoff, for development of the Volkswagen automobile
- 1959 Sir Geoffrey De Havilland, Major Frank Halford (in memoriam) and Charles C. Walker, for the first jet-powered passenger aircraft and engines
- 1960 Frederick Darcy Braddon, Sperry Gyroscope Company, for the three-axis gyroscopic navigational reference
- 1961 Robert Gilmore LeTourneau, Firestone Tire and Rubber Company, for large capacity earth moving equipment and giant size tires
- 1962 Lloyd J. Hibbard, for applying the ignitron rectifier to railroad motive power
- 1963 Earl A. Thompson, for design and development of the first successful automatic automobile transmission
- 1964 Igor Sikorsky and Michael E. Gluhareff, Sikorsky Aircraft Division, United Aircraft Corporation, for developing the high-lift helicopter leading to the Skycrane
- 1965 Maynard Pennell, Richard L. Rouzie, John E. Steiner, William H. Cook and Richard L. Loesch, Jr., Commercial Airplane Division, Boeing, for the design and manufacture of the family of jet transports, including the 707, 720 and 727
- 1966 Hideo Shima, Matsutaro Fuji and Shigenari Oishi, Japanese National Railways, for developing the New Tokaido Line
- 1967 Edward R. Dye (in memoriam), Hugh DeHaven and Robert A. Wolf, Cornell Aeronautical Laboratory, for their contribution to automotive safety
- 1968 Christopher Cockerell and Richard Stanton-Jones, for the development of commercially useful hovercraft.
- 1969 Douglas C. MacMillan, M. Nielsen and Edward L. Teale, Jr. for the design and construction of the NS Savannah
- 1970 Charles Stark Draper of the Massachusetts Institute of Technology Instrumentation Laboratories, for the successful application of inertial guidance systems to commercial air navigation.
- 1971 Sedgwick N. Wight (in memoriam) and George W. Baughman, for development of Centralized Traffic Control on railways
- 1972 Leonard S. Hobbs and Perry W. Pratt of Pratt & Whitney, for the design and development of the Pratt & Whitney JT3 turbojet engine
- 1973–74 No award
- 1975 Jerome L. Goldman, Frank A. Nemec and James J. Henry, Friede and Goldman, Inc. and Alfred W. Schwendtner, for the design and development of barge carrying cargo vessels
- 1977 Clifford L. Eastburg and Harley J. Urbach, Railroad Engineering Department of the Timken Company, for the development of tapered roller bearings for railroad and industrial use
- 1978 Robert Puiseux, Michelin for the development of the radial tire.
- 1979 Leslie J. Clark, for his contributions to the conceptualization and initial development of the sea transport of liquefied natural gas
- 1980 William M. Allen, Malcolm T. Stamper, Joseph F. Sutter and Everette L. Webb, Boeing, for the introduction of widebody commercial jet aircraft
- 1981 Edward J. Wasp, for his development of long distance pipeline slurry transport of coal and other finely divided solid materials.
- 1982 Jörg Brenneisen, Ehrhard Futterlieb, Joachim Körber, Edmund Müller, G. Reiner Nill, Manfred Schulz, Herbert Stemmler and Werner Teich, for their development of solid state adjustable frequency induction motor transmission for diesel and electric motor locomotives
- 1983 Sir George Edwards; General Henri Ziegler; Sir Stanley Hooker, (in memoriam); Sir Archibald Russell; and André Turcat; commemorating their outstanding international contributions to the successful introduction of commercial supersonic aircraft such as Concorde
- 1984 Frederick Aronowitz, Joseph E. Killpatrick, Warren M. Macek and Theodore J. Podgorski, for the development of a ring laser gyroscopic system incorporated in a new series of commercial jetliners
- 1985 Richard K. Quinn, Carlton E. Tripp and George H. Plude for numerous innovative design concepts and an unusual method of construction of the first 1,000 foot self-unloading Great Lakes vessel, the M/V Stewart J. Cort
- 1986 George W. Jeffs, Dr. William R. Lucas, Dr. George E. Mueller, George F. Page, Robert F. Thompson and John F. Yardley, for their contributions to the concept and achievement of a reusable Space Transportation System
- 1987 Harry R. Wetenkamp, for his contributions toward the development of curved plate railroad wheel designs
- 1988 John Alvin Pierce, for his work on the OMEGA Navigation System
- 1989 Harold E. Froehlich, Charles B. Momsen, Jr., and Allyn C. Vine, for their development of the deep-diving submarine, DSV Alvin
- 1990 Claud M. Davis, Richard B. Hanrahan, John F. Keeley, and James H. Mollenauer, for their development of the Federal Aviation Administration enroute air traffic control system
- 1991 Malcom Purcell McLean, for his work on intermodal containerization
- 1992 Daniel K. Ludwig (in memoriam) for the development of the modern supertanker
- 1993 Heinz Leiber, WolfDieter Jonner and Hans Jürgen Gerstenmeier, Robert Bosch GmbH for the development of the Anti-lock braking system in motor vehicles
- 1994 Russell G. Altherr, for the development of a slackfree connector for articulated railroad freight cars
- 1995 No award
- 1996 Thomas G. Butler (in memoriam) and Richard H. MacNeal(in memoriam), for the development NASA Structural Analysis (NASTRAN) as a working tool for finite element computation
- 1997 No award
- 1998 Bradford Parkinson, for the development of the Global Positioning System (GPS) for the precise navigation of transportation vehicles
- 1999 No award
- 2000 The staff of SNCF and Alstom between 1965 and 1981 who created the initial TGV High Speed Rail System
- 2001 No award
- 2002 Raymond Pearlson, for the development of a new system for lifting ships out of the water for repair
- 2003 No award
- 2004 Josef Becker, for the development of the Rudderpropeller, a combined propulsion and steering system
- 2005 Victor Wouk, for his development of gasoline engine-electric motor hybrid-drive systems for automobiles and his achievements in small, lightweight electric power supplies and batteries technology
- 2006 Antony Jameson, for his computational fluid dynamics in aircraft design.
- 2007 Robert F. Cook, Peter T. Mahal, Pam L. Phillips, and James C. White, for their work in developing Engineered Materials Arresting Systems (EMAS) for airport runway safety areas.
- 2008 Thomas P. Stafford, Glynn S. Lunney, Aleksei A. Leonov, Konstantin D. Bushuyev, for their work on the Apollo-Soyuz mission and the Apollo-Soyuz docking interface design
- 2009 Boris Popov, for the development of the ballistic parachute system allowing the safe descent of disabled aircraft
- 2010 Takuma Yamaguchi, for his invention of the ARTICOUPLE to allow an articulated tug and barge (AT/B) waterborne transportation system
- 2012 Zigmund Bluvband, President, ALD Group and Herbert Hecht, Chief Engineer, SoHaR Incorporated
- 2013 C. Donald Bateman, for his development of Honeywell’s Ground Proximity Warning System (GPWS)
- 2014 Alden J. "Doc" Laborde, Bruce G. Collipp and Alan C. McClure, for their technological developments in offshore oil and gas exploration and production in deep waters
- 2015 Michael Sinnet and the Boeing 787-8 development team, for their work on the Boeing 787-8
- 2016 Harri Kulovaara, for introducing developments to enhance the efficiency, safety and environmental performance of cruise ships
- 2017 Bruno Murari, in recognition of his engineering achievements at STMicroelectronics.
- 2018 Panama Canal Authority, for planning and successfully managing a program to undertake and complete a massive infrastructure project, the “Expansion of the Panama Canal.”
- 2019 George A. (Sandy) Thomson, in recognition of leading the innovation for water-lubricated polymer propeller shaft bearings for marine transport thereby eliminating the requirement for oil lubrication.
- 2020 To Dominique Roddier, Christian Cermelli, and Alexia Aubault for the development of WindFloat, a floating foundation for offshore wind turbines.
- 2021 To Michimasa Fujino in recognition of his singular achievement of research and development of new technologies for business aviation including the Over-the-Wing Engine Mount and Natural Laminar Flow airfoil, and the introduction to the market of commercial aircraft based on these technologies through the formation of HondaJet.
- 2022 To Asad Madni for his work in the development of the first solid-state gyroscope and its subsequent integration into a complete automotive inertial measurement unit integrated circuit for stability control

== See also ==
- List of engineering awards
- List of mechanical engineering awards
- List of awards named after people
