= Claud M. Davis =

American engineer (1924–2020)

Claud M. Davis (August 23, 1924 – May 5, 2020) was an American engineer, inventor, and employee of the IBM Corporation at Poughkeepsie, New York. He was known for his contributions to the development of the IBM System/360 and the development of air traffic control systems.

== Biography ==
Born in Water Valley, Mississippi, Davis received his BA in electrical engineering in 1950 at Oklahoma State University–Stillwater, and his MA in applied mathematics in 1961 from Harvard University.

After graduating from Oklahoma State, Davis started working at IBM in Memphis, TN and was relocated to Poughkeepsie, New York as an engineer in the mid-1950s. In the late 1950s he was promoted to Staff Engineer. In the 1960s Davis received multiple patents and was among the small group of engineers working under Gene Amdahl and Fred Brooks who designed the architecture for the System/360. The IBM System/360 (S/360) was a mainframe computer system family announced by IBM on April 7, 1964 and delivered between 1965 and 1978. It was the first family of computers designed to cover the complete range of applications, from small to large, both commercial and scientific. The design made a clear distinction between architecture and implementation allowing IBM to release a suite of compatible designs at different prices.

In the 1970s at IBM Davis became project leader of the development of a computer-aided air traffic control system for the Federal Aviation Administration, which was originally specified at Lincoln Laboratory. In 1989 he retired from IBM after almost 40 years of employment.

He died in May 2020 at the age of 95.

== Awards ==
Over the years Davis has received several awards:

- 1950. Eta Kappa Nu, Outstanding Senior Award
- 1950. Outstanding Engineering Graduate, Oklahoma State (A&M)
- Three Outstanding Contribution Awards, IBM Corporation
- 1983. IEEE Life-time Fellow awarded for "contributions to the architecture and development of a large fault-tolerant computer system for air traffic control"
- 1990 Elmer A. Sperry Award with Richard B. Hanrahan, John F. Keeley, and James H. Mollenauer for "the conception, design, development and delivery of the Federal Aviation Administration enroute air traffic control system."
- 1993. IEEE Simon Ramo Medal for "leadership in the pioneering development of computer-aided air traffic control systems."
