= Earl A. Thompson =

American engineer and inventor (1891–1967)

Thompson in 1963

Earl Avery Thompson (July 1, 1891 – April 20, 1967) was an American engineer and inventor who developed a synchromesh manual transmission and later led the General Motors engineering group that developed the Hydra-Matic automatic transmission.

== Life and career ==
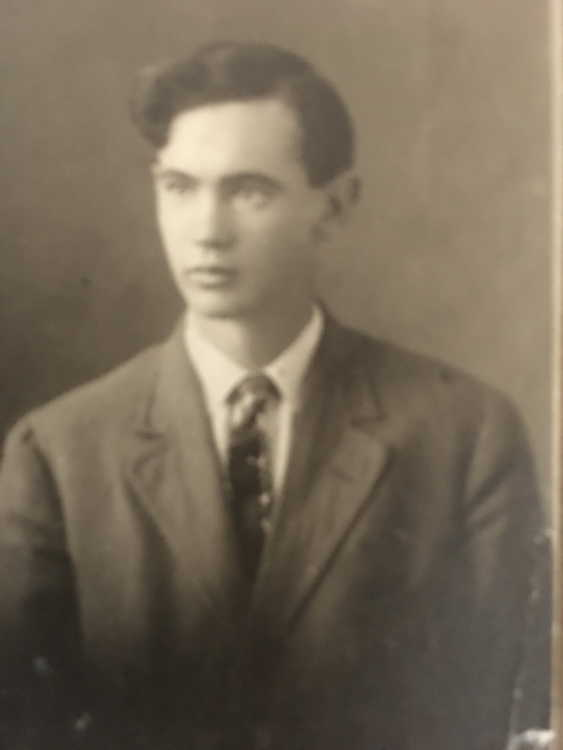
Earl Avery Thompson in his youth (unknown year)

Thompson was born in Elgin, Oregon, on July 1, 1891, the fifth of eight children of Samuel and Ella Hartley Thompson, who had migrated to Oregon by covered wagon and taken up farming in the Elgin area. His father, who was skilled in the blacksmith trade, kept a fully equipped blacksmith shop on the farm, where he repaired his own equipment and serviced his neighbors' equipment. The family moved to the Hood River area and then to Gresham, Oregon, where Thompson completed high school. He was educated at Oregon State University where he majored in mechanical and electrical engineering. While still a student, he worked one summer as a chauffeur and altered the transmission of a 1911 Pierce-Arrow so that it would shift smoothly both up and down. In a 1931 account, Thompson said he first conceived the idea of the synchromesh transmission during his school days in Portland, when a family friend and neighbor, W. W. Cotton, general attorney of the Union Pacific Railroad, let him drive his four-speed automobile; at 10 miles per hour (16 km/h) the driver had to wait 10 seconds before a shift could be made without the gears clashing. Thompson modified the car's shifting mechanism so that Cotton could shift silently at definite speeds.

In 1912, Thompson formed a small company to wire buildings for electricity, and the business later took on larger engineering projects. In 1913, the Opal Springs Water Company hired him to install a station to pump drinking water from Opal Springs to the town of Culver and the surrounding valley. The plan called for a water-driven pump on the Crooked River, a tributary of the Deschutes, with piping to carry the water over the thousand-foot valley wall. Thompson told the company that the best pump then commercially available would not do the job, but he was told to install the equipment as specified. The pump failed and eventually burst, and the water company went bankrupt. Thompson then raised $10,000 in Portland, bought the Opal Springs water rights, and designed a new pump, which the Portland Iron Works cast and machined at a cost of ten cents per pound. The pump ran until 1929, when it was replaced with commercially available equipment to provide more capacity. Thompson operated the Opal Springs Water Company until 1958, when it was taken over by the communities it served.

Thompson came to Detroit in 1925 and was a General Motors employee from 1929. According to the Sperry Award booklet and his obituary, he left General Motors in 1939 to begin his own business; a 1943 history of Ferndale gives May 1, 1940, as the date he left GM. The firm, the E.A. Thompson Manufacturing Company of Ferndale, Michigan, was described in his obituary as an automotive parts supplier, and he was its president until his death. Thompson manufactured the Thompson Automatic Profiling Milling machine which was used by manufacturers in the production of parts for armaments, planes, tanks, and guns. After leaving GM, he served as a consultant during the early production of the Hydra-Matic transmission. By 1963 he was president of the E. A. Thompson Manufacturing Company, which then specialized in making hydraulic valve lifters. By 1964, his former GM colleague William L. Carnegie was manager of the company's plant in Marine City, Michigan. Thompson, who lived in Bloomfield Hills, Michigan, died on April 20, 1967, at the age of 75, at William Beaumont Hospital in Royal Oak, Michigan. His funeral was held at Christ Church, Cranbrook, in Bloomfield Hills, and he was entombed in White Chapel Memorial Cemetery. He was survived by his wife, Elizabeth; two sons, Lyle C. and Harold K.; two daughters; 18 grandchildren; and three great-grandchildren.

== Achievements ==
Thompson in 1933, as Cadillac's assistant chief engineer

=== The synchromesh transmission ===
Thompson's 1918 invention of a synchromesh manual transmission using a tapered cone synchronizer to prevent gear clash U.S. patent 1,435,430 in March 1922 would make shifting a manual transmission faster, easier and safer. While still working on his electrical and water company projects, Thompson reasoned that the speeds of the driving and driven gears could be synchronized mechanically at the moment of shifting, so that the driver would not need to pause between gears; he proposed placing individual cone clutches between the clutch gears and the drive gears, and built an experimental model. During the same period, he and a fellow engineer designed an infinitely variable hydraulic transmission and installed it on a crawler tractor, but they could not perfect it, partly for lack of capital. "In April of 1922 Thompson, armed with drawings and data for a prototype synchromesh transmission, set out for Detroit to sell it to the automobile industry. But the automobile manufacturers were not impressed; their customers, he was told, were satisfied with transmissions just as they were. Thompson persisted. After several trips between Oregon and Detroit, and months spent improving the design, and two more patent applications (U.S. patent 2,101,825 and U.S. patent 1,888,640), he was finally able to arrange a meeting with Lawrence Fisher, managing director of Cadillac Motor Car Division and Ernest Seaholm, Cadillac's chief engineer. They were interested in the idea, and [in 1924] Thompson was retained as a consultant while the transmission was perfected." According to the Sperry Award booklet, Thompson traveled east by train in April 1922 and spent more than a month visiting factories and business offices; Ernest Seaholm was among those who showed some interest. Back in Oregon, Thompson rebuilt the transmission of a well-known automobile to his synchromesh principles, and in September 1923 he drove the car from Portland to Detroit, a ten-day trip, and stayed in the East for three months without finding a buyer. In 1924 he built three more transmissions, and on his third trip to Detroit he obtained permission to install them experimentally on production cars of two manufacturers. The president of one of these companies arranged a luncheon with Fred Fisher, vice president of General Motors, who in turn arranged the meeting with Lawrence Fisher and Seaholm. Over the following three years, four more versions of the synchromesh transmission were designed and built, each with further simplifications and lower manufacturing costs. A 1931 newspaper account said Thompson worked 12 years developing the transmission and, after coming to Cadillac in 1925, continued its development with Seaholm's help, making ten models in all. Cadillac tested more than two dozen prototypes before putting the design into production.

After the transmission had been tested over 1,500,000 miles (2,400,000 km) at the General Motors Proving Ground, it was put into production in 1928. Production began in August 1928, and the first cars to use Thompson's synchromesh transmission design were 1929-model Cadillac and LaSalle cars, followed by Oldsmobile, Buick, and Oakland models in 1931, and Chevrolet cars in 1932. By May 1931, Cadillac had built 80,000 cars with the transmission. Thompson sold his synchromesh transmission patents to GM in 1924 and 1930; one report put the price at $1 million, but Thompson never revealed how much he received. In 1931 Thompson listed four advantages of the synchromesh transmission: safety, simplicity of control, quicker acceleration, and easy, silent shifting. He said it was safer because a driver could shift down quickly, for example into second gear on a downgrade to use the engine as a brake, without clashing the gears.

Thompson became an employee of Cadillac Motor Car Division on September 1, 1929, and was appointed to be assistant chief engineer, at Seaholm's invitation. Thompson continued improving the design of the synchronizer. In 1932, Thompson began working on the development of an automatically shifting transmission. In March 1933 Cadillac appointed him special assignment engineer, heading a new department created by its engineering division; O. M. Nacker succeeded him as assistant chief engineer. He believed a step-ratio transmission could be shifted by hydraulic servo-mechanisms, and the door of the project's quarters was labeled "Military Transmission" and "Keep Out—This Means You". The following year, Thompson was transferred from Cadillac to the General Motors Corporation Engineering Department when GM management reassigned the automatic transmission project there to protect it, fearing that the Cadillac brand might not survive the Great Depression.

=== GM Automatic Safety Transmission Development ===
In 1934, at GM Engineering, Thompson became the project leader of a group of four engineers including Ralph F. Beck, William L. Carnegie, Walter B. Herndon, and Maurice S. Rosenberger. This group developed the Automatic Safety Transmission, an optional semi-automatic transmission for some 1937–1939 Oldsmobile and 1938 Buick vehicles. Beck and Herndon were Thompson's first co-workers on the project, and Carnegie and Rosenberger joined later. The project had the support of GM president Alfred P. Sloan, engineering vice president Ormond E. Hunt, and Charles L. McCuen of Oldsmobile. Oldsmobile began preparing Thompson's design for production early in 1936. It was a four-speed planetary transmission that still used a clutch pedal for starting, with one manual shift between a two-speed automatic low range and a two-speed automatic high range, made under power without the clutch. It reached the market in mid-1937 and remained an Oldsmobile option until the Hydra-Matic replaced it for the 1940 model year.

=== GM Hydra-Matic Transmission Development ===
In June 1936 a fifth engineer, Oliver K. Kelley, joined Thompson's group; he was transferred from G.M.C. Truck and Coach Division where the development of a hydraulic torque converter drive for a transit bus was proceeding. Thompson's group combined a fluid coupling with a unique hydraulically controlled, automatically shifting 4-speed planetary transmission, introduced as an option on 1940 Oldsmobiles as Hydra-Matic, the world's first mass-produced fully automatic transmission. Kelley's first assignment was a fluid coupling for automatic starting, which removed the need for a clutch pedal; together with a planetary reverse gear and a new hydraulic governor and pressure modulator system, it completed the fully automatic design, which was judged ready for production in 1939. The newly formed Detroit Transmission Division was given responsibility for manufacturing it, with Carnegie as chief engineer, Beck and Herndon as staff engineers, Rosenberger as experimental engineer, and Kelley as assistant chief engineer. About 25,000 units were sold in the first model year, and Cadillac adopted the Hydra-Matic a year later; the thirteen-millionth Hydra-Matic was produced in 1963. The 1940 Hydra-Matic transmission would continue to be refined and produced for another 16 years, including wartime use in U.S. military vehicles such as the M5 Stuart and M24 Chaffee tanks, as well as armored cars and troop transports.

== Awards ==
- Recipient of the Elmer A. Sperry Award in 1963 for design and development of the first successful automatic automobile transmission. The award was presented on January 15, 1964, at Cobo Hall in Detroit during the SAE Automotive Engineering Congress and Exposition, "for outstanding leadership and genius exhibited in the design and development of the first notably successful automobile transmission capable of automatically changing drive ratio without perceptible relaxation of drive torque." Beck, Carnegie, Herndon, Kelley and Rosenberger received certificates of citation with the award. Speaking at the award luncheon, Thompson recalled, "We had many, many failures," and described the development as a matter of "cut and try" over long periods.

== Manual transmission patents ==
1. 1918/1922 US Patent US1435430 for an Automatic gear-shifting mechanism for sliding gear transmission
2. 1923/1937 US Patent US2101825 for an Automatic Gear Shifting Mechanism
3. 1925/1932 US Patent US1888640 for a Transmission

== Automatic transmission patents ==
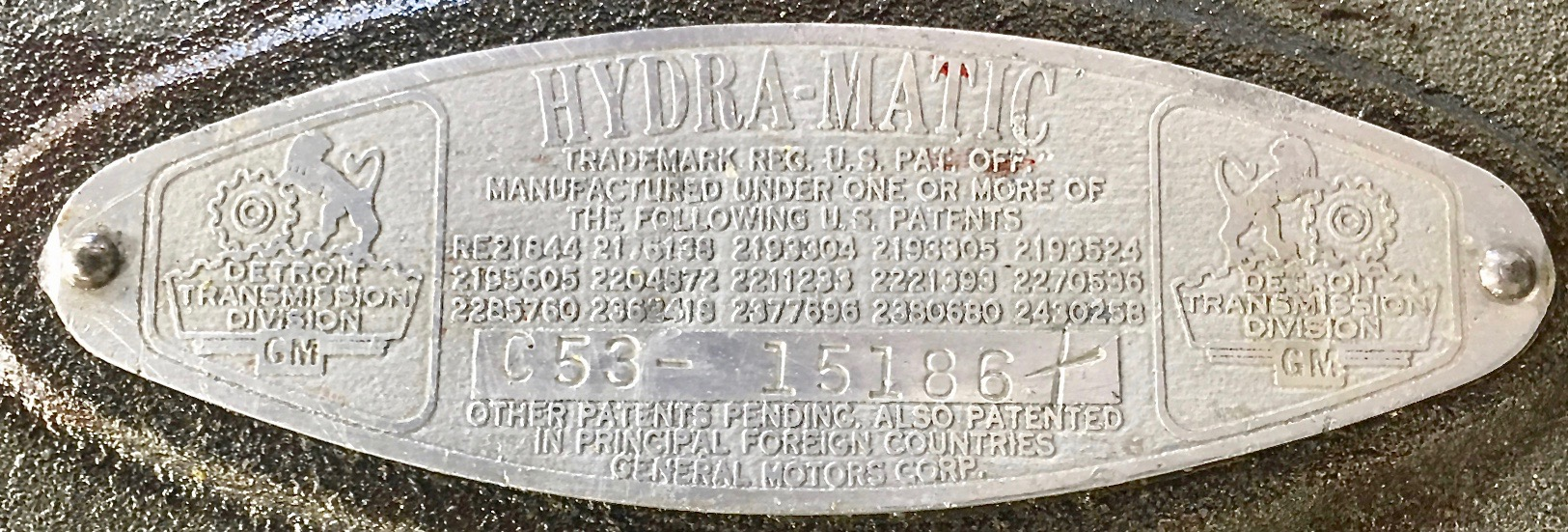
The Identification tag of a 1953 Hydra-Matic Transmission showing 15 Patents, 9 were Thompson's

Thompson was awarded 22 patents. Nine of his patents were directly related to the development of the Hydra-Matic transmission

1. 1933/1942 US Patent US2285760 for Change Speed Gearing with Automatic Overdrive
2. 1934/1940 US Patent US2195605 for Change Speed Transmission and Control
3. 1935/1940 US Patent US2193304 for Change Speed Mechanism and Control
4. 1937/1940 US Patent US2193305 for Brake and Clutch Capacity Control
5. 1937/1940 US Patent US2193524 for Change Speed Gearing and Control
6. 1937/1944 US Patent US2362418 for Clutch and Gearing Control
7. 1938/1940 US Patent US2204872 for Change Speed Gearing and Control
8. 1940/1945 US Patent US2380680 for Clutch and Control
9. 1940/1947 US Patent US2430258 for Rotary Hydraulic Coupling of the Turbine Type
