= Alan Saunders (public servant) =

English cricketer and businessman

Personal information
- Full name: Alan Arthur Saunders
- Born: 15 December 1892; Brighton, Sussex, England
- Died: 26 February 1957 (aged 64); Hove, Sussex, England
- Batting: Right-handed
- Bowling: Unknown

Domestic team information
- Years: Team
- 1922–1923: Sussex

Career statistics
Competition	First-class
Matches	12
Runs scored	186
Batting average	11.62
100s/50s	–/–
Top score	36
Balls bowled	260
Wickets	2
Bowling average	64.50
5 wickets in innings	–
10 wickets in match	–
Best bowling	1/6
Catches/stumpings	9/–
- Source: Cricinfo, 18 December 2011

Sir Alan Arthur Saunders OBE (15 December 1892 – 26 February 1957) was an English cricketer and businessman. Saunders was a right-handed batsman, though his bowling style is unknown. He was born at Brighton, Sussex. He served as chairman of the British Sugar Corporation and the National Research Development Corporation.

== Military career ==
Saunders served in the Royal Engineers as an acting major during the First World War for which he was appointed an Officer of the Order of the British Empire.

== Cricketing career ==
Saunders made his first-class debut for Sussex against Hampshire in the 1922 County Championship. He made eleven further first-class appearances for the county, the last of which came against Nottinghamshire in the 1923 County Championship. In his eleven first-class matches, he scored 186 runs at an average of 11.62, with a high score of 36. With the ball, he took 2 wickets at a bowling average of 64.50, with best figures of 1/6.

== Business career ==
Saunders acted as Co-ordinator of Building Supplies for the Ministry of Health in the late 1940s for which role he was knighted. He became chairman of the British Sugar Corporation in 1949 and also served as chairman of the National Research Development Corporation from 1955. He died at Hove, Sussex on 26 February 1957. His widow, Lady Saunders, died in 1974.
