= Maynard Pennell =

American businessman (1910–1994)

Maynard L. Pennell (April 12, 1910 – November 22, 1994) was a Boeing executive and aircraft designer.

Born in Skowhegan, Maine, his family moved to Seattle in 1920. Pennell studied aeronautical engineering, graduating from the University of Washington in 1931. While a student at Washington, he was inducted into the Tau Beta Pi engineering honor society and became a brother of the Pi Kappa Phi social fraternity.

After working for the Douglas Aircraft Company for six years, he joined Boeing in 1940. He became assistant manager for the B-29 Superfortress program in 1942 and was involved in the development of the B-52 Stratofortress, later joining the commercial development division, where he was involved in the creation of the Boeing 707 and Boeing 727, a keen advocate of the development of jet-powered civil aircraft.

== Boeing SST ==
In the 1960s, Pennell managed the Boeing 2707 supersonic transport program, in a contest against the Lockheed L-2000 for the right to manufacture the airframe. In 1966, Boeing unveiled a model of a 300-passenger, 330-foot-long aircraft meant to fly at almost three times the speed of sound. Although Boeing won the contest, the SST project ran into objections from various groups and the plane was never built, leaving Concorde to become the first SST aircraft, making its first test flight in 1969.

== Awards ==
In 1965, Pennell was awarded the Elmer A. Sperry Award for distinguished engineering and was a member of the National Academy of Engineering and the American Institute of Aeronautics and Astronautics. In 2007, he was a co-recipient of the Distinguished Group achievement Diamond Award from the University of Washington for his work on the development of the passenger jet. Since 1989, Boeing has endowed a research professorship in structural analysis in his honor at the University of Washington.

Pennell retired from Boeing in 1974, and died in Seattle in 1994 from Parkinson's disease.
