= Harri Kulovaara =

Finnish naval architect

Harri U. Kulovaara is a Finnish naval architect and the Executive Vice President for Maritime & Newbulding for Royal Caribbean Cruises Ltd.

== Early life ==
Kulovaara was raised in Turku. He received a Master of Science Degree in civil engineering from the Technical University of Helsinki.

== Career ==
Kulovaara designed two ferries for Silja Line, including the MS Silja Serenade. He was the Senior Vice President of Eff John International.

In 1995, Kulovaara and Njål Eide were hired by Royal Caribbean Cruises Ltd to run the company's shipbuilding. They oversaw the development of the MS Voyager of the Seas. Since 1995, Kulovaara has designed ten ships which were the largest passenger ship when launched.

He won the Elmer A. Sperry Award in 2016.

He is a visiting professor at the University of Strathclyde.

== Personal life ==
Kulovaara lives in Miami, Florida.
