= Syncrolift =

Supplier of ship-handling equipment for shipyards

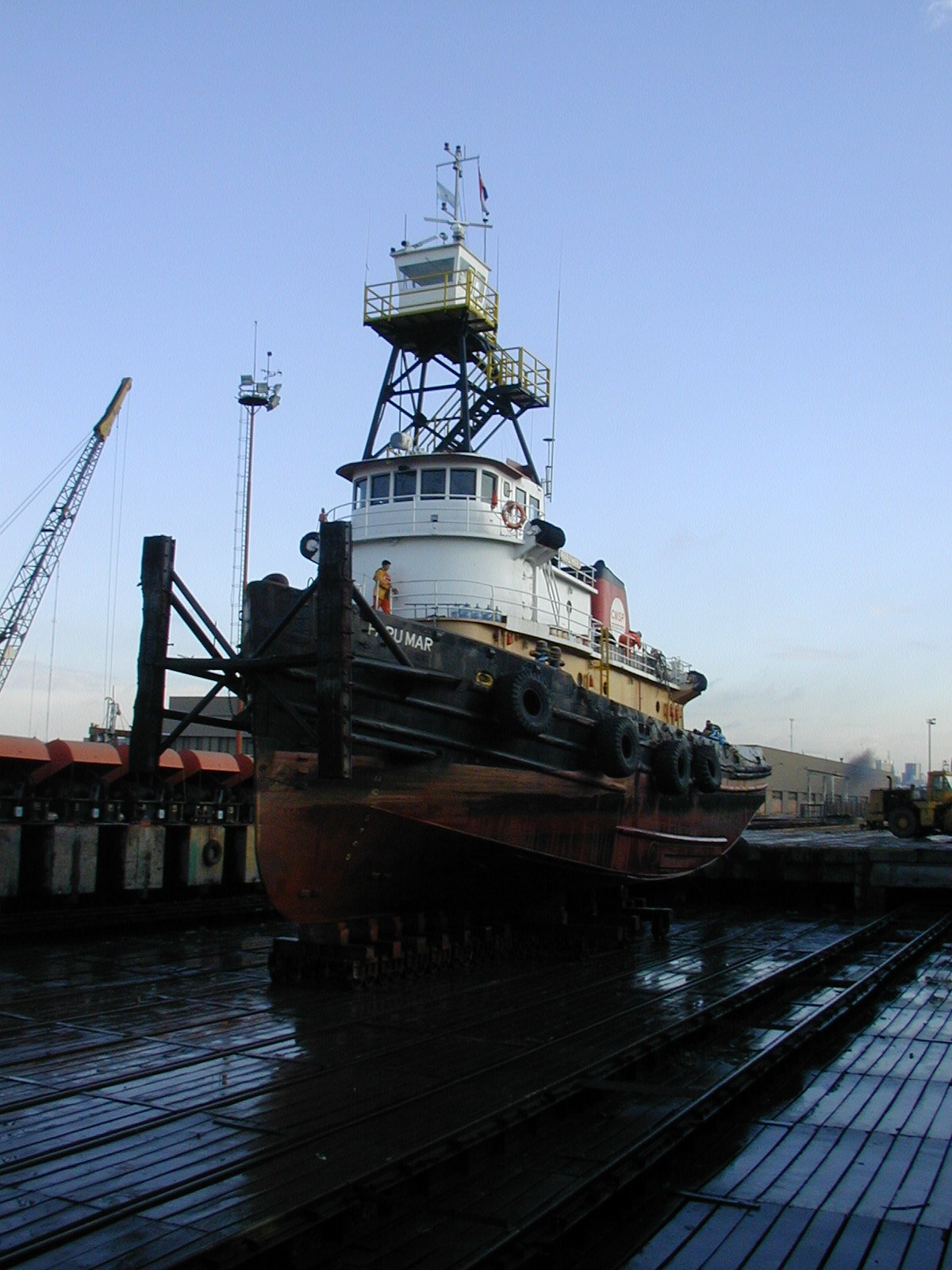
Syncrolift, Buenos Aires

Syncrolift AS is a supplier of ship-handling equipment for shipyards. It manufactures the Syncrolift shiplift.

== Shiplift ==
The Syncrolift shiplift is a piece of equipment for lifting boats, ships and vessels onto land and back at sea for maintenance work or repair.

The vessel is maneuvered over a submerged cradle, which is then lifted by a set of synchronized hoists or winches. The vessel can be worked upon in place, or it can be moved inland.

The largest shiplifts can lift vessels up to 100,000 tons. Because of this capacity, shiplifts have almost completely supplanted the older dry dock systems, most of which could handle only one vessel at a time.

== History ==
The Syncrolift shiplift was invented in the mid-1950s by Raymond Pearlson when he was working as Chief Engineer for Merrill Stevens, a small Miami shipyard. In 1958 he formed Pearlson Engineering Company (PECO) to develop his invention.

In 1979, PECO was taken over by the British engineering group Northern Engineering Industries (NEI) . PECO became NEI Syncrolift, and later part of Rolls-Royce. Rolls-Royce developed the modern Syncrolift shiplift until 2015.

In 2002, Raymond Pearlson was awarded the Elmer A. Sperry Award for the "invention, development and worldwide implementation of a new system for lifting ships out of the water for repair and for launching new ship construction.".

== Links ==
www.syncrolift.com
