= Christopher Cockerell =

English engineer, inventor of the Hovercraft (1910–1999)

Sir Christopher Cockerell
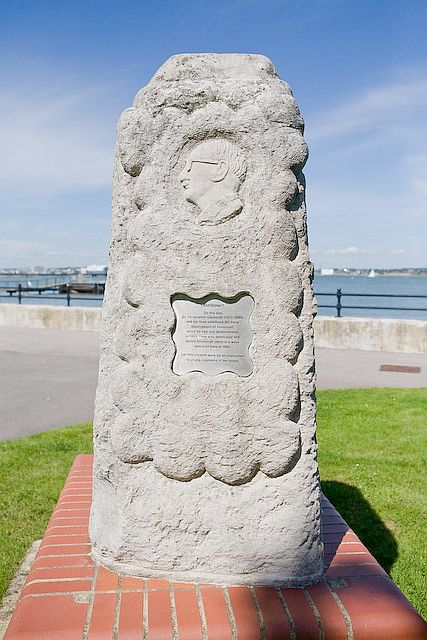
- Memorial to Cockerell at Hythe, Hampshire
- Born: 4 June 1910; Cambridge, England
- Died: 1 June 1999 (aged 88); Hythe, Hampshire, England
- Education: Peterhouse, Cambridge
- Known for: Hovercraft
- Spouse: Margaret Belsham (m. 1937; died 1996)
- Children: 2
- Awards: Fellow of the Royal Society; RDI; Elmer A. Sperry Award; Royal Medal (1966); Albert Medal (1966)
- Scientific career
- Fields: Mechanical Engineering

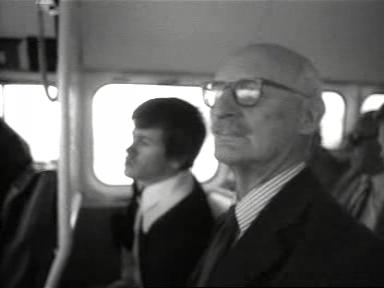
Cockerell in 1976

Sir Christopher Sydney Cockerell (4 June 1910 – 1 June 1999) was an English engineer, best known as the inventor of the hovercraft.

== Early life and education ==
Cockerell was born in Cambridge, where his father, Sir Sydney Cockerell, was curator of the Fitzwilliam Museum, having previously been the secretary of William Morris. His mother was the illustrator and designer Florence Kingsford Cockerell. Christopher attended the preparatory school of St Faith's. Christopher was educated at Gresham's School, Holt, Norfolk. He was admitted to Peterhouse, Cambridge, to read mechanical engineering, and later returned to Cambridge to study radio and electronics.

== Early career ==
He began his career as a post graduate pupil working for W. H. Allen, Sons & Co. of Bedford from 1931 to 1933. After returning to the University of Cambridge in 1934 to study radio and electronics, he went to work at the Radio Research Company. In 1935, he went to work at the Marconi Company, and soon afterwards he married Margaret Elinor Belsham (4 September 1913 – September 1996). They lived at the now Grade II listed Gay Bowers Cottage in Danbury, Essex from 1940 to 1951.

During his time in Chelmsford, he led a research team in the Marconi hut at Writtle and worked on many systems, including radar.

After the war he contributed to the development of several sophisticated pieces of equipment, including radio location technology, and the first equipment used by the BBC in Alexandra Palace.

== Hovercraft ==
After Cockerell left the Marconi Company, he bought Ripplecraft Ltd., a small Norfolk boat and caravan hire company, with a legacy left by his father-in-law. The firm made little money, and Cockerell began to think how the craft could be made to go faster. He was led to earlier work by the Thornycroft company, in which a small vessel had been partially raised out of the water by a small engine. Cockerell's greatest invention, the hovercraft, grew out of this work. It occurred to him that if the entire craft were lifted from the water, the craft would effectively have no drag. This, he conjectured, would give the craft the ability to attain a much higher maximum speed than could be achieved by the boats of the time.

Cockerell's theory was that instead of just pumping air under the craft, as Thornycroft had, if the air were to be instead channelled to form a narrow jet around the perimeter of the craft, the moving air would form a momentum curtain, a wall of moving air that would limit the amount of air that would leak out. This meant that the same cushion of high-pressure air could be maintained by a much smaller engine; and for the first time, a craft could be lifted completely out of the water. Cockrell tested his designs across the village green opposite his house in the Broadland village of Somerleyton in Suffolk.

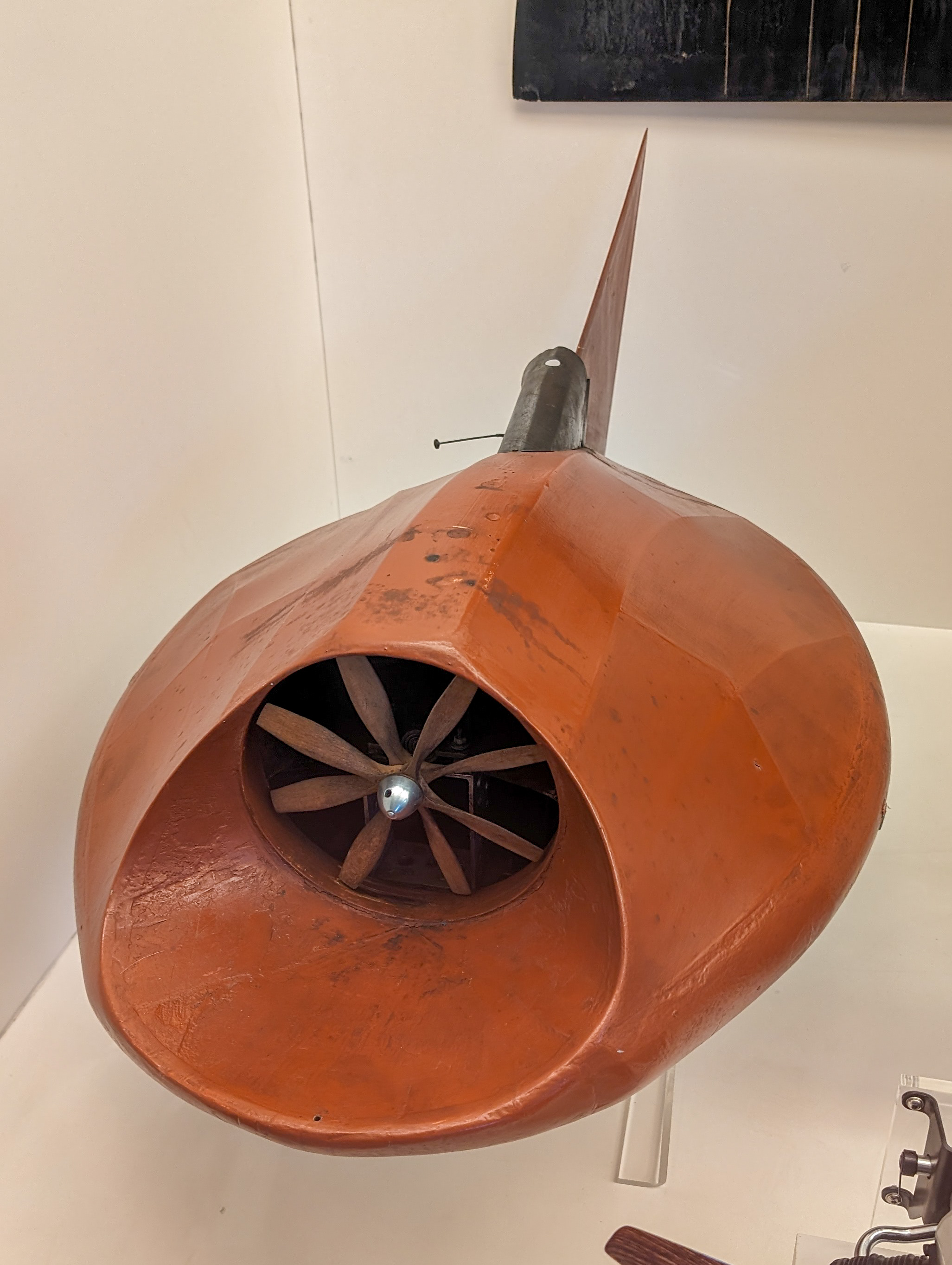
Cockerell's hovercraft model from 1955 in the Science Museum, London

He tested his theories using a vacuum cleaner and two tin cans. His hypothesis was found to have potential, but the idea took some years to develop, and he was forced to sell personal possessions to finance his research. By 1955, he had built a working model from balsa wood and had filed his first patent for the hovercraft, No. GB 854211. Cockerell had found it impossible to interest the private sector in developing his idea, as both the aircraft and the shipbuilding industries saw it as lying outside their core business.

He therefore approached the British Government with a view to interesting them in possible defence applications. The leaders of the defence groups were not interested in providing funding and put the idea of the hovercraft on the government's secret list. Being on the secret list stopped Cockerell from making his design public.

It remained classified until 1958, upon news of similar developments on the continent, it was declassified, and Cockerell was introduced to the NRDC (National Research Development Corporation). In the autumn of 1958, the NRDC placed an order with Saunders-Roe for the first full-scale hovercraft. This prototype craft was designated the SR.N1 (Saunders-Roe – Nautical One) and was manufactured under licence from the NRDC. On 11 June 1959, the SR.N1 was first shown to the public, which was capable of carrying four men at a speed of 28 miles per hour. Weeks later, it was shipped over to France. It successfully crossed the English Channel between Calais and Dover on 25 July 1959, 50 years to the day after the historic crossing by Bleriot.

In January 1959, the NRDC formed a subsidiary called Hovercraft Development Ltd. Cockerell was the Technical Director and the company controlled the patents which it used to license several private sector firms to manufacture craft under the registered trademark of Hovercraft.

Cockerell received an Honorary Doctorate from Heriot-Watt University in 1971.

== Later life ==
In later life, Cockerell developed many other improvements to the hovercraft, and invented various other applications for the air cushion principle, such as the hovertrain. He attended many hovercraft related events, such as the unveiling of many hoverports across the United Kingdom.

After a short illness, Cockerell died at Hythe, Hampshire on 1 June 1999, three days before his 89th birthday.

Cockerell was awarded £5,000 by the British Government of the 1960s, the only practical official recognition of the value of his work, though he was given a knighthood.

== Other work ==
In later life, Cockerell developed the Cockerell Raft, a wave power hydraulic device which may have implications in the future for electricity generation.

== Awards ==
- 1965 Awarded the Howard N. Potts Medal
- 1966 Made a CBE
- 1967 Elected a Fellow of the Royal Society
- 1968 Awarded Elmer A. Sperry Award for his development of the Hovercraft
- 1969 Knighted for his services to engineering

== Commemoration ==
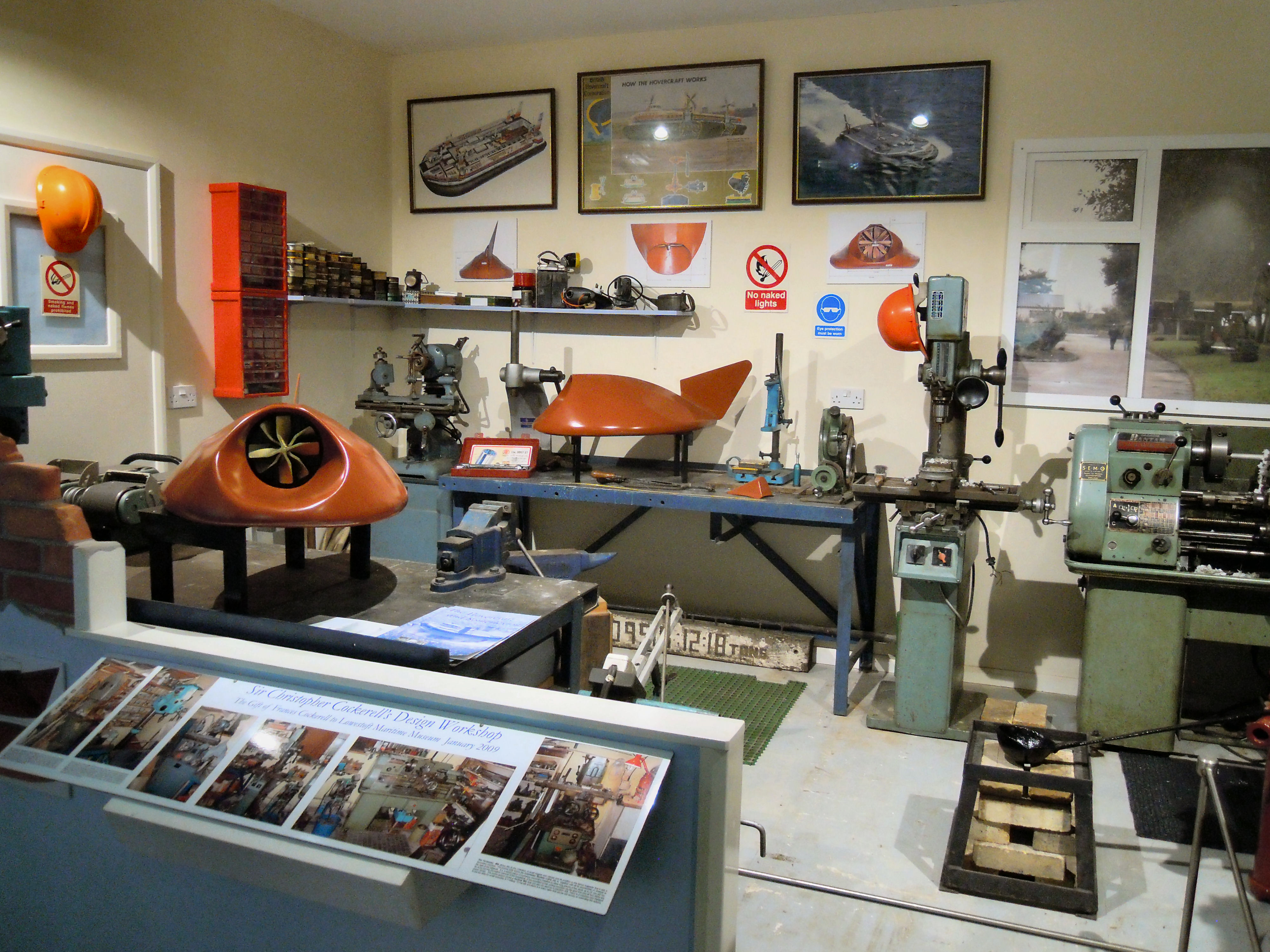
Cockerell's workshop reassembled at Lowestoft Maritime Museum

In his life, the SR.N4 hovercraft GH2008 Sir Christopher was named after its inventor. It was operated by Hoverlloyd (later Hoverspeed) across the channel from 1972 to 1991.

A plaque in Cockerell Rise, East Cowes, Isle of Wight, marks the location of White Cottage, where Cockerell lived and worked. The Cottage has been demolished, but the garage still stands. The plaque was erected by Friends of East Cowes with financial support from the Big Lottery Fund.

Cockerell's workshop, including his left-handed lathe, was given to the Lowestoft Maritime Museum on his death in 1999 where it was reassembled and is now on show to the public.
