= Raymond Pearlson =

- Born: March 2, 1926 (age 100); New York City, U.S.
- Education: University of Michigan
- Occupation: Marine engineer
- Known for: Inventor of the Syncrolift system
- Spouse: Marge Pearlson
- Children: 5
- Awards: Elmer A. Sperry Award (2002)

Raymond Pearlson (born 2 March 1926) is an American marine engineer and the inventor of the Syncrolift System, which was designed to both launch ships and lift them out of the water for repair.

== Biography ==
Pearlson was born in 1926 in New York City. After three years war service in the Navy he studied naval architecture and marine engineering at the University of Michigan, graduating in 1949 with a B.Sc. degree.

He started his engineering career with the Newport News Shipbuilding and Dry-dock Company, spending the next few years working in various yard departments where he acquired a lot of practical shipbuilding knowledge. In 1953 he moved to work as Chief Engineer at Merrill Stevens, a small shipyard in Miami, Florida, where he was entrusted with the construction of a 300-ton lifting capacity boatlift and transfer system. During the process he developed an innovative drydocking concept using simple electro-mechanical components to overcome the inherent limitations of lifting capacity and size.

In 1957, he designed and built the first Syncrolift shiplift with a lifting capacity of 100 tons, and in 1958 formed Pearlson Engineering Company (PECO) to develop his invention. PECO was taken over in 1959 by the British engineering group Northern Engineering Industries, which later became part of Rolls-Royce plc. PECO became NEI Syncrolift, Inc. in 1986. In 1990 Pearlson and his son Douglas, President of the company, both left to form Pearlson and Pearlson, a shipyard consultancy specializing in drydocking and transfer systems.

Pearlson received the 2002 Elmer A. Sperry Award for the invention, development and worldwide implementation of the Synchrolift system.
