= Allyn Vine =

Physicist and oceanographer (1914–1994)

Allyn C. Vine (1914–1994) was a physicist and oceanographer who was a leader in developing crewed submersible vessels to explore the deep sea.

== Projects ==
- Major contributor to redesigning the bathythermograph during World War II. His version could be used on submarines to detect the ocean thermocline.
- Inspiration for DSV Alvin which is a deep sea exploration craft named using a contraction of his name.

== See also ==
- Maurice Ewing
