= Kenneth R. Hall =

American chemical engineer (born 1939)

- Born: 1939 (age 86–87)
- Other names: Ken Hall; K. R. Hall

Academic background
- Education: University of Tulsa (BS); University of California, Berkeley (MS); University of Oklahoma (PhD)

Academic work
- Discipline: Chemical engineering
- Institutions: Texas A&M University

Kenneth R. Hall (born 1939) is an American chemical engineer. He is a professor emeritus of chemical engineering at Texas A&M University, where he held the Jack E. and Frances Brown Chair.

Hall was born in 1939, and attended the University of Tulsa for his BS degree in 1962, the University of California, Berkeley, for his MS degree in 1964, and the University of Oklahoma for his PhD degree in 1967.

Hall joined Texas A&M University in College Station, Texas, as an associate professor in 1974. In 1990, he was named a fellow of the American Institute of Chemical Engineers. In 1999, he was named a regents professor in the Texas A&M University System. Following an endowment by alumnus Jack E. Brown, he was made the Jack E. and Frances Brown Chair in Engineering in 2001. In 2002, he became a fellow of the International Union of Pure and Applied Chemistry.

In 2011, Hall went to the Texas A&M University at Qatar and became the associate dean for research and graduate studies. The Texas Engineering Experiment Station appointed Hall as associate director in 2015. He retired from Texas A&M in 2015. During his career, he published roughly 270 journal publications and 8 books. His work advanced the field of gas-to-liquid processing and research into the thermophysical properties of fluids. A special issue of the Journal of Chemical & Engineering Data was published in his honor.
