= Harold E. Froehlich =

American engineer

Harold Edward "Bud" Froehlich (July 13, 1922 – May 19, 2007) was an American engineer who helped design Alvin, a deep-diving exploratory submarine that has been used to find a lost atomic bomb and explore the wreck of Titanic.

Froehlich was born in Minneapolis, Minnesota. "Bud" graduated from Roosevelt High School and later graduated from the University of Washington and earned a master's degree in aeronautical engineering from the University of Illinois at Urbana-Champaign.

Froehlich grew up with his father, Reinhard Froehlich, mother, Meta Froehlich, and sister, Catherine Froehlich. He lived with his wife, Avanella Froehlich, and children, Steven (Jean) Froehlich and Jane Froehlich.

Harold invented high-altitude balloons to take air samples and medical staples in his lifetime, in addition to helping invent the Alvin.

He died of heart failure in Maplewood, Minnesota at 84 years old.
