= SR.N1 =

First practical hovercraft

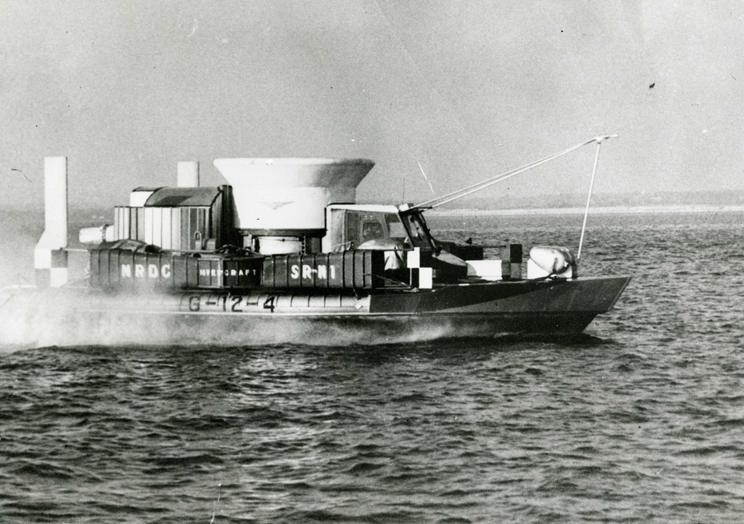
SR.N1

The Saunders-Roe SR.N1 (Saunders-Roe Nautical 1) was the first practical hovercraft. The concept has its origins in the work of British engineer and inventor Christopher Cockerell, who succeeded in convincing figures within the services and industry, including those within British manufacturer Saunders-Roe. Research was at one point supported by the Ministry of Defence; this was later provided by the National Research Development Corporation (NRDC), who had seen the potential posed by such a craft.

In order to test the theories and overall concept, it was decided that a full-scale craft would be constructed, designated as the SR.N1. On 11 June 1959, it performed its first flight in front of the public. The SR.N1 participated in the test programme for four years prior to its retirement, by which point it had served its purpose in successfully validating the concept and further hovercraft had been developed.

In less than four years following the SR.N1's maiden flight, multiple hovercraft were being designed and produced by several companies in the United Kingdom, as well as in France by Jean Bertin and Japan by Mitsubishi Shipbuilding & Engineering under a license given by Westland Aircraft.

== Development ==
=== Origins ===
During the 1950s, British manufacturing firm Saunders-Roe was diversifying in various new fields and product lines; this had been in part due to urgency having been placed on seeking alternative projects to take the place of the cancelled Saunders-Roe SR.177 interceptor aircraft. In particular, the firm held an intense interest in developing advanced watercraft, such as its commissioning of a two-year study into the potential production of nuclear submarines for freight delivery purposes and the development of an advanced amphibious beach survey vessel, known as WALRUS. Also during this time, British engineer and inventor Christopher Cockerell had been exploring his own concepts on how to produce more efficient fast-moving watercraft, involving multiple technologies such as inflatable air cushions, pump-jets and centrifugal fans; these would effectively emerge as a single new form of amphibious vehicle, later known as the hovercraft.

Having tested and found substance to his theories during the early 1950s, Cockerell proceeded to approach various aircraft companies and shipbuilders, but had difficulty gaining their backing, in part due to a lack of understanding of the technologies involved. Undeterred, his work soon attracted the attention of Lord Mountbatten, the First Sea Lord of the Royal Navy, who arranged for a demonstration of his model to Admiralty representatives and patent officials in 1956. One of the Admiralty observers, Ron Shaw, was impressed by the concept and provided valuable support. The work was classified as an official secret for over four years, but neither the Royal Air Force, Royal Navy, or British Army seemingly gave the project any serious interest. Shaw and Cockerell approached Saunders-Roe, who agreed to study the concept and produce a report on it if they were issued with a contract. This arrangement would be the foundation of a long-lasting partnership between Cockerell and Saunders-Roe to develop and sell this new form of transport.

In August 1957, an initial contract to perform theoretical and experimental analysis of the concept was awarded to Saunders-Roe. The firm's chief of aerodynamic research, John Chaplin, promptly met with Cockerell and became quickly enthusiastic about the project. Finding the existing experimental data and methodology to have been sound, Chaplin favourably reported back to the Saunder-Roe's chief engineer. Following a series of wind tunnel, tow tank, and free-flight tests, alongside use of a new two-dimensional test rig as well as use of the original research, the firm published two reports in May 1958. These reports confirmed the validity of Cockerell's theories and data in addition to noting the considerable potential of the hovercraft concept; Saunders-Roe was keen to be awarded a further contract to continue its research.

As there was no expressed military need for such an aircraft, it was impossible for the Ministry of Defence to finance further development; however, at Shaw's suggestion, a proposal was made to the National Research Development Corporation (NRDC), an independent public body. On 17 April 1958, Cockerell had his first meeting with the NRDC to present his idea; the managing director, Lord Halsbury, was so impressed that he decided that immediate action was necessary. On the following day, the NRDC board confirmed its decision to support the project, soon noting that it would be the organisation's biggest project to date. The NRDC promptly issued Saunders-Roe with a contract and authorisation to proceed. In 1959, a specialised subsidiary of the NDRC, named Hovercraft Development Limited (HDL), for which Cockerell was appointed as technical director to handle the contract with Sauders-Roe and built up a patent portfolio. Although officially led by Chaplin, Cockerell had considerable involvement in the ongoing design process.

=== Construction ===
Saunders-Roe determined that, in addition to more theoretical work, a test programme involving a large-scale radio-controlled model would be necessary to provide sufficient data to make progress, and produced a proposal to this effect on 4 September 1958. In October 1958, the second stage of the contract was awarded, enabling advanced research into the development of the proposed air cushion and the corresponding principles, such as intake design, directional stability, and control; design studies were also performed for various sizes of hovercraft, ranging from 70-ton to 15,000-ton craft. It was at this point that the first pair of manned models were also proposed, of which Model A was selected to proceed with.

Development of the craft was not straightforward, having posed several challenges and difficulties that needed to be overcome from the onset. Early on, one criticism of the Model A was that the single annular peripheral jet engine would be incapable of adequate pitch and roll stability while the diagonal stability jets featured on Cockerell's original model had been eliminated; however Saunders-Roe's aerodynamics office were confident that the design was good. In part to answer these doubts, a three-dimensional model was produced and subjected to wind tunnel tests, which revealed extreme instability. A 'stop design' order was promptly issued on the cushion system while further tests were performed, which determined that the addition of single peripheral jets remained inadequate for the original design. As the use of transverse jets, as used on the original model, was impractical, an extended planform was adopted along with an additional peripheral jet along the outside to address the stability issue. After further model testing, the bottom surface was inclined at a shallow 6-degree angle as well.

Construction of the Model A, which had since been renamed as the "Saunders-Roe Nautical 1" (SR.N1), had continued while the matter of stability was being addressed. Several models were built to support development of the design, including the 1:6 scale radio-controlled model, which was tested in secret on the Isle of Wight. The final configuration of the SR.N1 has been altered considerably from its initial revision, having adopted a twin-jet configuration along with an estimated weight increase from 4,000 lb (1,800 kg) to 6,600 lb (3,000 kg). Throughout 1958 and into 1959, work on the design and production on the SR.N1 proceeded under the leadership of Saunders-Roe's chief designer Maurice Brennan.

== Design ==
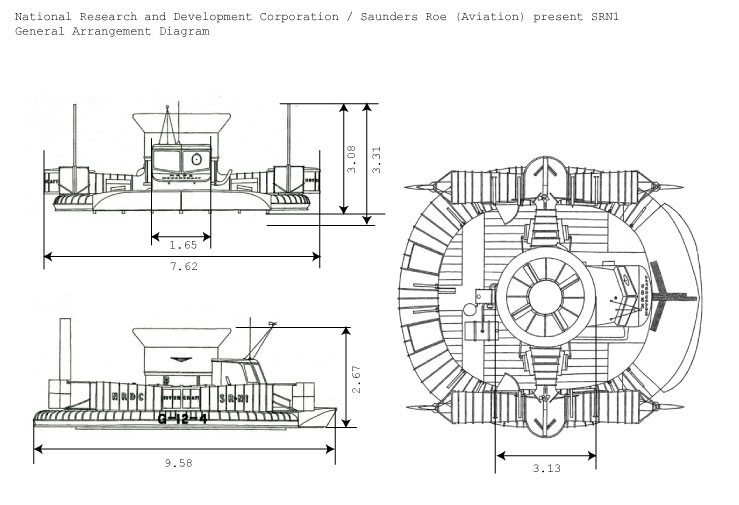
SR.N1 general arrangement

The SR.N1 was the world's first full-sized hovercraft. It was controlled from a small cab placed just forward of the cylindrical centre piece set into the middle of the deck which contained the craft's engine and horizontally mounted fan. For aerodynamic efficiency, the fan and the wall of the centre piece had very little clearance, while the exterior wall of the centre piece itself was heavily reinforced so that the crew would be protected in the event of a catastrophic engine failure. The core of the vehicle was a rivetted aircraft-grade aluminium alloy sheet buoyancy tank, which had been coated with a thin layer of pure aluminium to protect against corrosion.

It was powered by an Alvis Leonides radial piston engine that drove a lift fan, and using ducted air generated by the fan for propulsion. Forward and backward thrust was provided via a set of longitudinal ducts which were fixed to either side of the craft's deck and supplied with air from the engine housed within the cylindrical centre piece to which they were attached. The outer jet was installed upon closely mounted 2-foot-long ribs and running to within four inches of the inner jet; the inclined surface between the inner and outer jets was plated and reinforced against the impact of waves or inadvertent ditching. Simple rotatable aerofoils were installed on the ends of the ducts to exert control forces; the vertical aerofoil on the aft end was extended to form a pair of conventional aerodynamic rudders.

The development of the SR.N1 had involved the development and registering of a number of patentable technologies, a portion of which being extensions of Cockerell's original concepts and patents. These patents included the craft's annular jet cushion, plenum chamber burning, compartmentation jets for stability, powered and unpowered recirculation techniques, and various configurations of flexible skirts. The supporting research for the acquisition of such patents had been typically performed by HDL, who conducted extensive experiments and built full-scale test beds as part of their activities.

== Operational service ==
On 29 May 1959, the completed SR.N1, with the test serial number G-12-4, performed its first engine run. This engine run was aborted when telemetry from onboard accelerometers had indicated high stress levels which threatened the craft's structural stability in the long term; these stresses had been generated as the result of an integral shroud that had been placed around the plane of the fan to increase aerodynamic efficiency, and was quickly resolved by its removal, providing greater clearance for the tips of the fan blades. Only a day later, on 30 May 1959, the first full power engine tests were carried out.

More extensive test runs of the engine revealed a few minor issues, such as a level of instability within the valves of the thrust control system, which were modified accordingly ahead of the scheduled first flight. On 7 June 1959, all of the required system checks that had been imposed by the design office test schedule had been completed successfully. During one hover test, an instance of pitch instability was revealed, which was found to be due to the bleed air arrangement adopted for the propulsion air, resulting in last-minute corrective changes being carried out during the final three days prior to the craft's maiden flight.

On 11 June 1959, the SR.N1 conducted its first flight, demonstrating its capability to cross both land and water, in front of various assembled members of the press. While the demonstration was only intended to involve land-based motion, in response to pressure from enthusiastic journalists, the company decided to proceed with the first water-based flight on that day as well. The demonstration received considerable press coverage, the majority of which being largely positive; reportedly, the craft was dubbed by some in the media as "the flying saucer". The flight was documented in the Look At Life film Flight On A Cushion.

On 13 June 1959, the second sea trial was performed, which included full power runs and emergency ditching drills being tested; experience from this trial run resulted in the rapid addition of a hydrodynamic planning bow to reduce the tendency of the craft to dib into waves. Later tests were also conducted, including the first operational transition between land and water to prove its true amphibious capabilities, which had been viewed as a vital attribute. On 22 June 1959, the SR.N1 participated in its first 'operational' sortie during an exercise with the Royal Marines on Eastney Beach, Portsmouth; the performance of the craft during the exercise was commended by the services.

On 25 July 1959, the 50th anniversary of Louis Blériot's cross-channel flight, the SR.N1 crossed the English Channel from Calais to Dover in just over two hours; the crew during this crossing consisted of Captain Peter Lamb (pilot), John Chaplin (navigator) and Cockerell himself.

Testing had revealed several interesting tendencies of hovercraft, such as the inevitable delay between the heading of the craft changing and the direction that it was travelling in changing to match. In addition, travelling overland posed more difficulty than traversing water due to the lack of motion attenuation generated by wave drag. Considerable skill on the part of the pilot was typically required to counter the effects of phenomena such as cross winds and ground slopes.

In 1961, the SR.N1 was outfitted with a flexible skirt which greatly improved the effective depth of the air cushion. During the following year, an aft-facing Bristol Siddeley Viper III jet engine, mounted on the rear of the decking behind the lift fan housing, supplemented the ducted-air propulsion produced by the piston engine, increasing the craft's maximum speed from 35 to 50 knots; the Viper installation followed an earlier installation of a Blackburn/Turbomeca Marboré of approximately half the Viper's thrust. The SR.N1 was involved in tests for a total of four years prior to its retirement, having demonstrated the practicality of the concept.

The SR.N1 itself has been preserved and placed on public display at the Science Museum at Wroughton. Models of the SR.N1 were available in both die-cast metal form in the Corgi Toys range, and as a 1:72 scale plastic construction kit from Airfix.
