= Jules-André Peugeot =

First French soldier killed in WWI (1893–1914)

- Peugeot c. 1913–1914
- Born: 11 June 1893; Etupes, Doubs, France
- Died: 2 August 1914 (aged 21); Joncherey, Territoire de Belfort, France
- Burial place: Etupes Cemetery, Doubs, France
- Military career
- Allegiance: France
- Branch: French Army
- Service years: 1913–1914
- Rank: Corporal
- Units: 14th Infantry Division, 27th Infantry Brigade, 44th Regiment, 6th Company
- Conflicts: World War I: Skirmish at Joncherey †

Jules-André Peugeot (French: [pøʒo]; 11 June 1893 – 2 August 1914) was the first French soldier to die in World War I. He died one day before the German Empire formally declared war on France, in the same skirmish in which Albert Mayer became the first soldier and first German soldier to die.

== Early life ==
Jules-André Peugeot was born on 11 June 1893. Before being called up for compulsory military service in 1913, Peugeot was a teacher.

== Death ==
On mid morning on August 2, 1914, a German cavalry patrol led by Leutnant Albert Mayer patrolled into France before war had been officially declared. Upon crossing into French territory, Mayer slashed a French sentry with his saber before going deeper into France.

Around 9:30, Peugeot and his fellow soldiers were eating breakfast in a billet house owned by Louis Doucourt. Doucourt's daughter, Adrienne, came in and told the soldiers that a German patrol had entered the town, at which Peugeot and his comrades arose from breakfast to meet them. At 9:59, Peugeot yelled at Mayer and his patrol to stop, as they were under arrest, but Mayer pulled out a pistol and shot Peugeot in the shoulder. Peugeot stumbled and shot his pistol, missing Mayer, but Peugeot's comrades returned fire, hitting Mayer in the stomach and head, killing him. Peugeot went back to the billet house where, at 10:37 am, he died on the steps of the house.

== Legacy ==
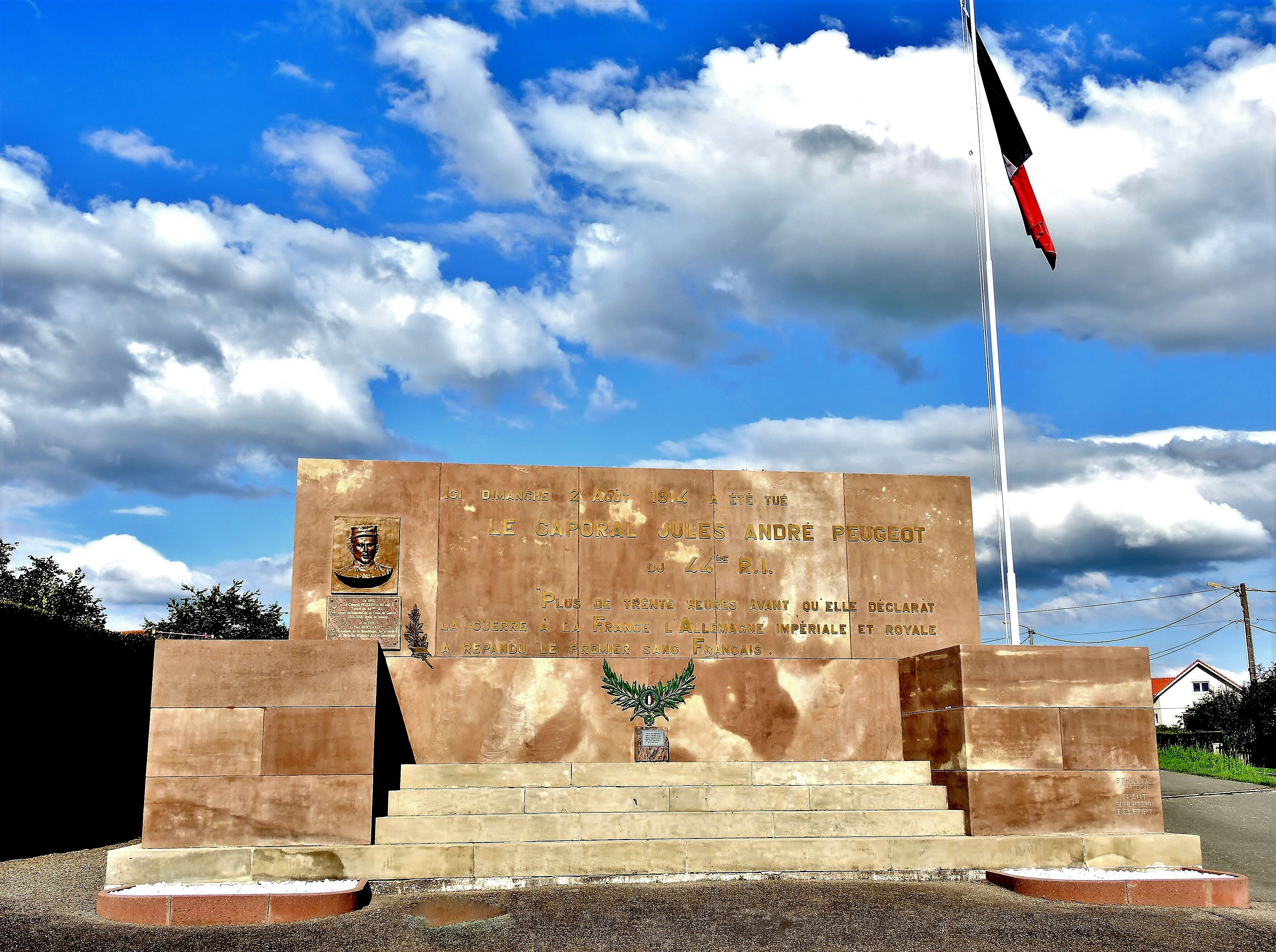
Corporal Peugeot Monument

On the seventh anniversary of Peugeot's death, the French government erected a monument on the Alsatian border to commemorate the place where he died.

== See also ==
=== First soldiers killed in World War I ===
- Albert Mayer, the first soldier and first Imperial German Army soldier killed, August 2, 1914
- Antoine Fonck, the first Belgian Army soldier killed, August 4, 1914
- John Parr, the first British Army soldier killed, August 21, 1914
- Thomas Enright, one of the first three American Army soldiers killed, November 3, 1917
- Merle Hay, one of the first three American Army soldiers killed, November 3, 1917
- James Bethel Gresham, one of the first three American Army soldiers killed, November 3, 1917

=== Last soldiers killed in World War I ===
- George Edwin Ellison, the last British Army soldier killed, at 9:30 a.m. November 11, 1918
- Augustin Trébuchon, the last French Army soldier killed, at 10:45 a.m. November 11, 1918
- Marcel Toussaint Terfve, the last Belgian Army soldier killed, at 10:45 a.m. November 11, 1918
- George Lawrence Price, the last Canadian Army soldier killed, at 10:58 a.m. November 11, 1918
- Henry Gunther, the last soldier and last American Army soldier killed, at 10:59 a.m. November 11, 1918
