= Thomas Enright =

American soldier (1887–1917)

Thomas Francis Enright
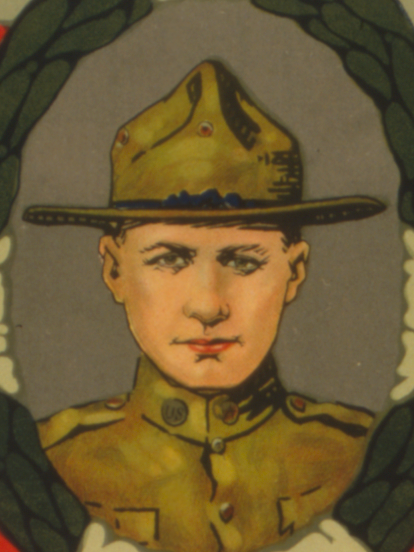
- Born: May 7, 1887; Bloomfield, Pennsylvania, U.S.
- Died: November 3, 1917 (aged 30); Lorraine, France
- Burial place: St. Mary Cemetery, Pittsburgh, Pennsylvania
- Military career
- Allegiance: United States
- Branch: United States Army
- Service years: 1909–1916; 1917
- Rank: Private
- Units: Company F, 16th Infantry Regiment, 1st Infantry Division
- Conflicts: Philippine Insurrection; Pancho Villa Expedition; World War I †

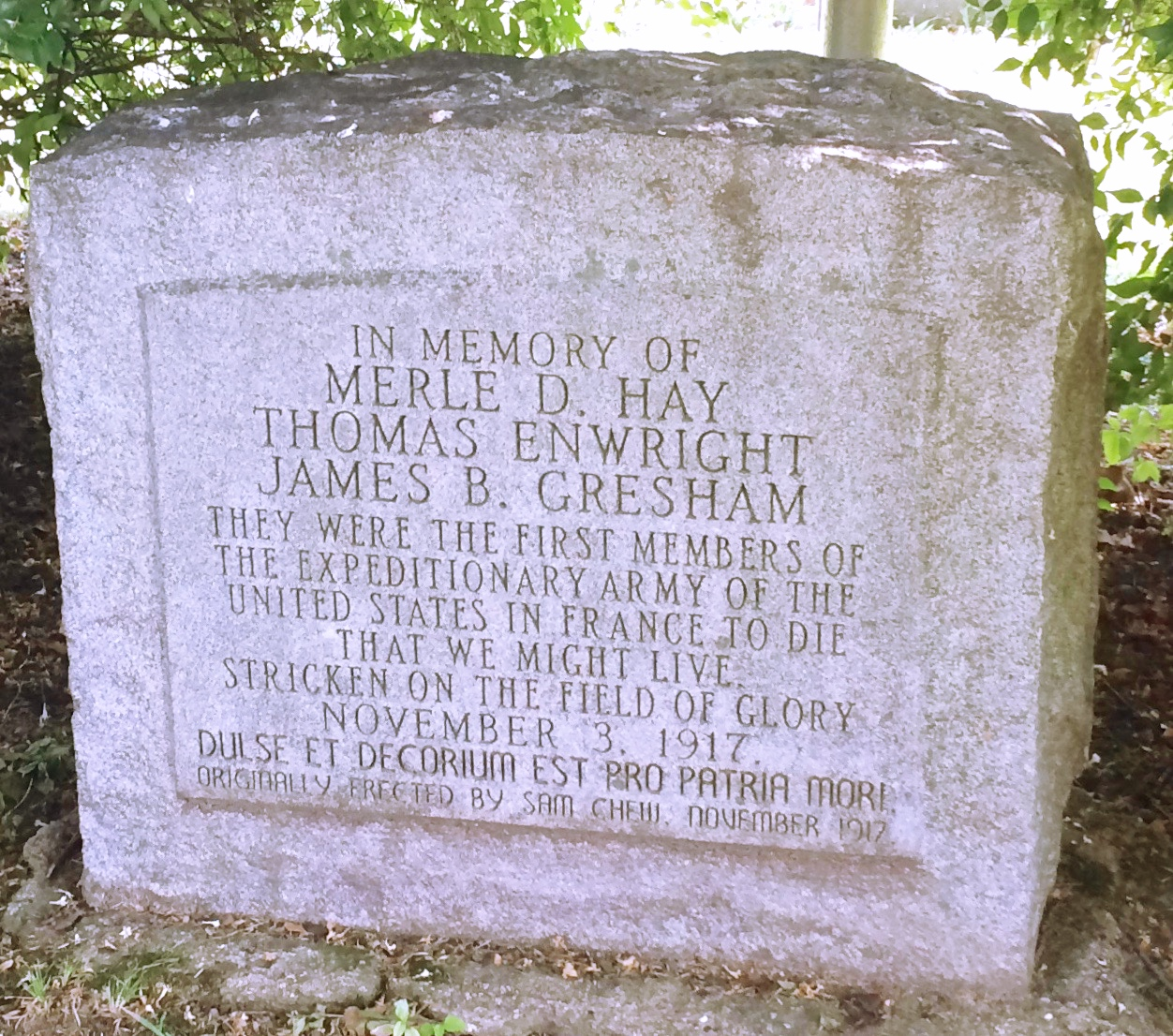
Monument at the Crawford County Courthouse in Van Buren, Arkansas (Note incorrect spelling of last name)

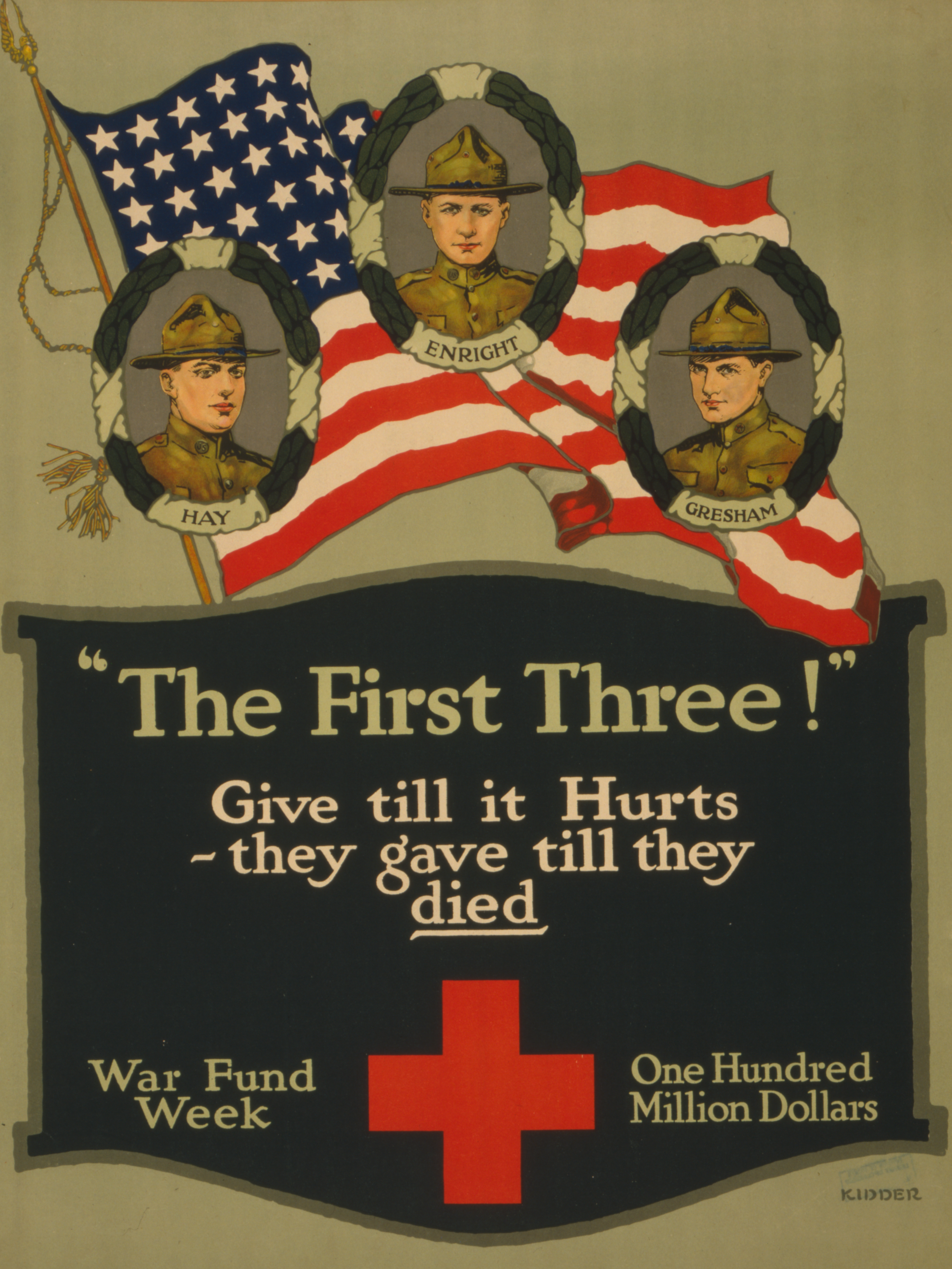
First three American soldiers to die fighting in World War I, Merle Hay, Thomas Enright and James Bethel Gresham 1917 poster

Thomas Francis Enright (May 7, 1887 – November 3, 1917) was the first Pennsylvania serviceman, and perhaps the first American serviceman to die in combat while assigned to an American unit, in World War I, along with Corporal James Bethel Gresham of Evansville, Indiana, and Private Merle Hay of Glidden, Iowa.

== Early life and military service ==
Thomas Francis Enright was born May 8, 1887, in Bloomfield, Pennsylvania. He was the seventh child of Irish immigrants, Ellen and John Enright. He was also their first child not to be born in Ireland. He enlisted in the U.S. Army in 1909. He had served in post-Boxer Rebellion China and earned the title expert cavalryman while fighting Moros during the Philippine Insurrection. By 1914, he was serving in Veracruz with the 16th Infantry Regiment. In 1916, he was in Mexico again serving under John J. Pershing, during his expedition to locate and capture Pancho Villa. Sometime after this, he left the army and returned to the Pittsburgh area.

== World War I service ==
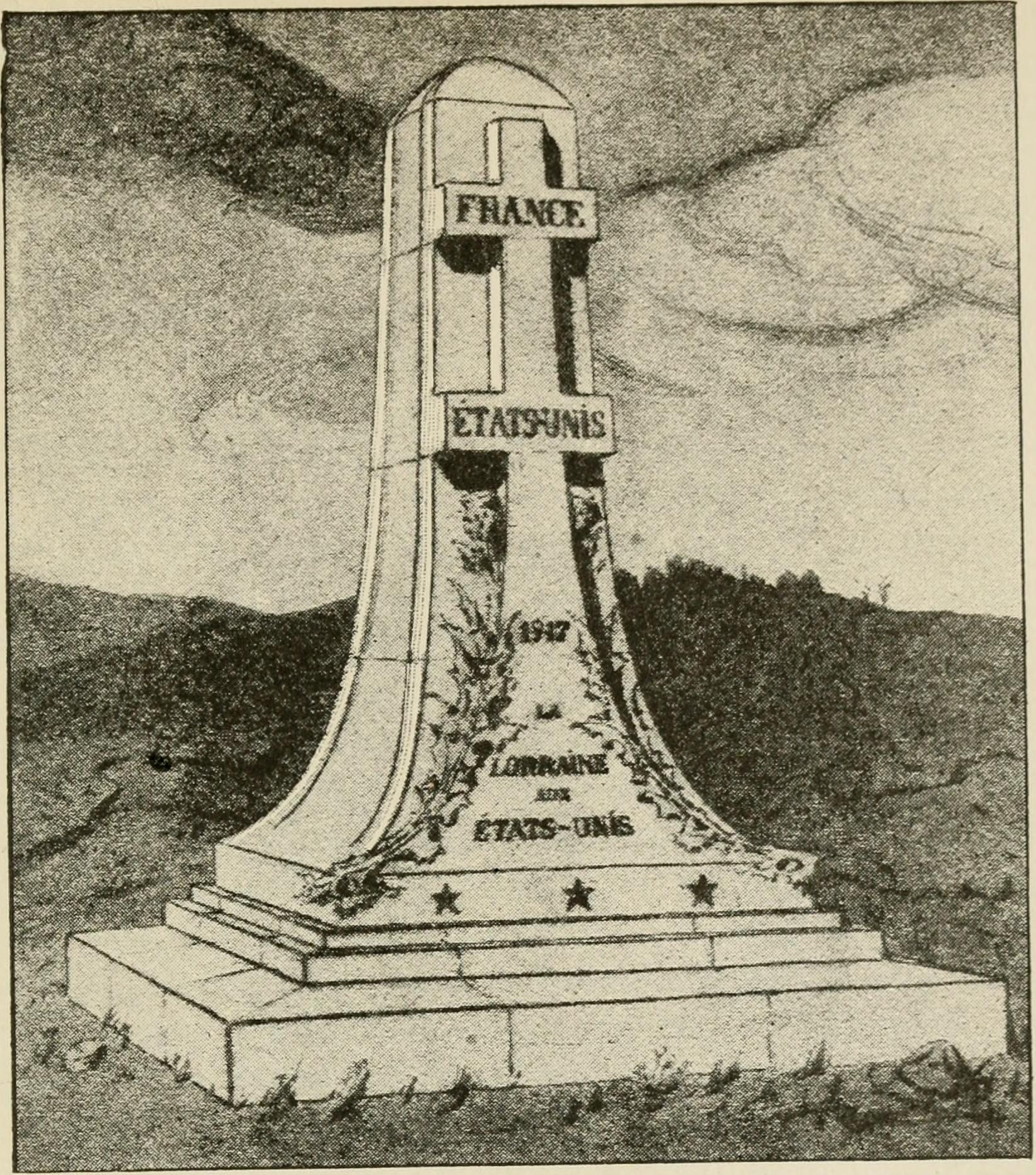
Monument to James B. Gresham, Merle D. Hay and Thomas F. Enright, designed by Louis Majorelle, erected November 1918 in Bathelémont, destroyed by the Germans in October 1940

After a short return to Pittsburgh, Enright reenlisted and joined the 16th Infantry at Fort Bliss, Texas. On 26 June 1917, the regiment disembarked in St. Nazaire, France, as part of the 1st Infantry Division. Four months later, Enright's company was moved to the trenches of position 'Artois', near the village of Bathelémont, Lorraine, France. In the early morning of 3 November 1917, the Imperial German Army attacked. After an hour of fighting, Enright, along with Corporal James Bethel Gresham, and Private Merle Hay were the first three casualties of the American Expeditionary Force.

Two days later, on 5 Nov 1917, Enright, Gresham, and Hay were buried near the battlefield where they had died. An inscription marked their graves: "Here lie the first soldiers of the illustrious Republic of the United States who fell on French soil for justice and liberty." Their bodies were eventually returned to their families and reburied in the United States. On 16 July 1921, the city of Pittsburgh honored him with his casket lying in state at the Soldiers and Sailors National Military Museum and Memorial located in the city's Oakland section. The funeral procession was led by a gun casson drawn by six horse followed by a memorial service, led by Bishop of Pittsburgh, Hugh Charles Boyle, was held at the St. Paul Cathedral. Afterwards the procession continued to St. Mary Cemetery in the city's Lawrenceville neighborhood where Enright was reburied with full military honors after which a wreath from General Pershing was laid upon his grave.

== See also ==
=== First soldiers killed in World War I ===
- Albert Mayer, the first soldier and first Imperial German Army soldier killed, August 2, 1914
- Jules-André Peugeot, the first French Army soldier killed, August 2, 1914
- Antoine Fonck, the first Belgian Army soldier killed, August 4, 1914
- John Parr, the first British Army soldier killed, August 21, 1914
- Merle Hay, one of the first three American Army soldiers killed, November 3, 1917
- James Bethel Gresham, one of the first three American Army soldiers killed, November 3, 1917

=== Last soldiers killed in World War I ===
- George Edwin Ellison, the last British Army soldier killed, at 9:30 a.m. November 11, 1918
- Augustin Trébuchon, the last French Army soldier killed, at 10:45 a.m. November 11, 1918
- Marcel Toussaint Terfve, the last Belgian Army soldier killed, at 10:45 a.m. November 11, 1918
- George Lawrence Price, the last Canadian Army soldier killed, at 10:58 a.m. November 11, 1918
- Henry Gunther, the last soldier and last American Army soldier killed, at 10:59 a.m. November 11, 1918
