= Merle Hay =

American soldier (1896–1917)

Merle David Hay
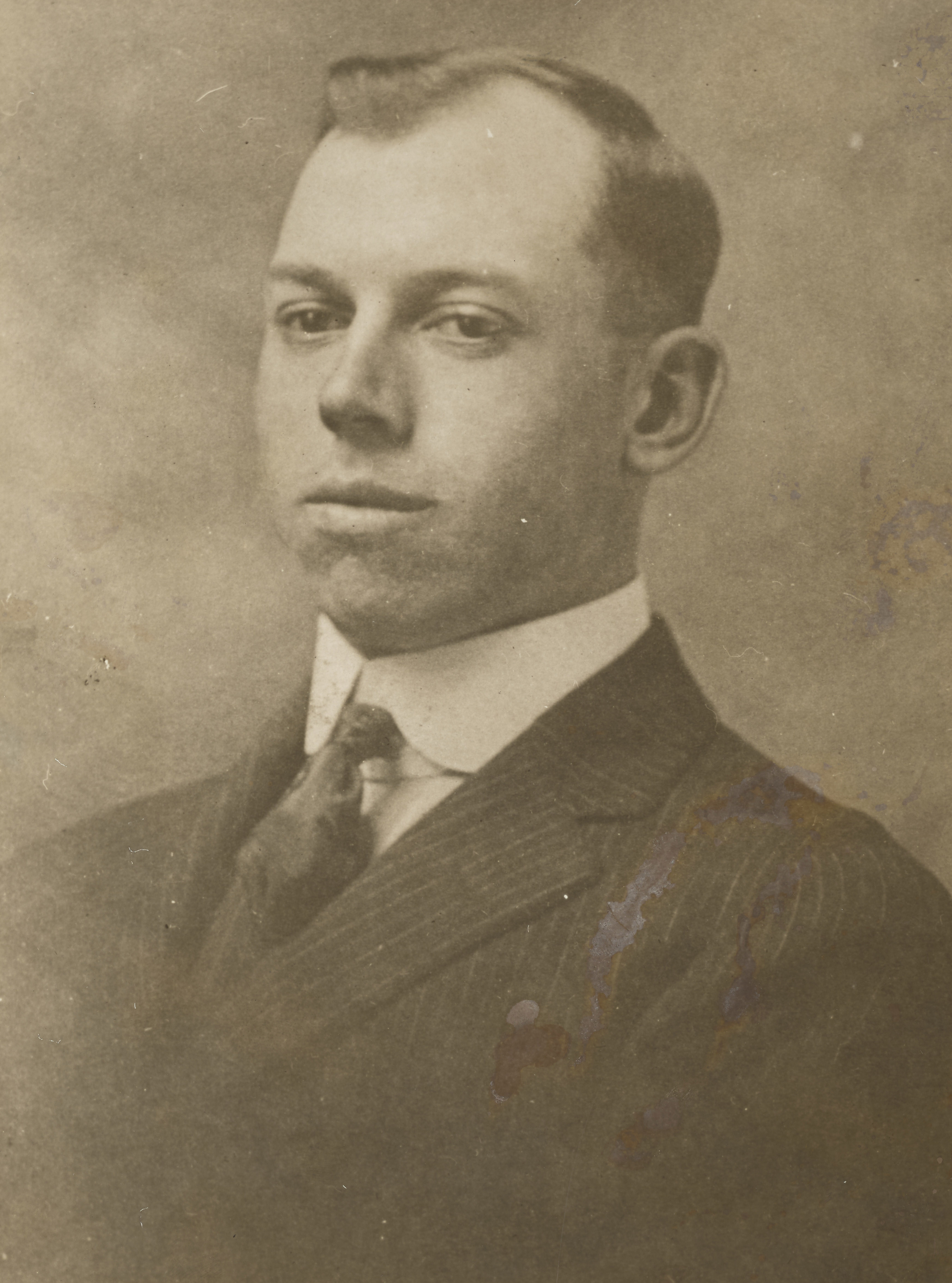
- Portrait of Hay
- Born: July 20, 1896; Carroll County, Iowa, US
- Died: November 3, 1917 (aged 21); Lorraine, France
- Burial place: West Lawn Cemetery, Glidden, Iowa
- Military career
- Allegiance: United States
- Branch: US Army
- Service years: 1917
- Rank: Private
- Units: Company F, 16th Infantry Regiment, 1st Infantry Division
- Conflicts: World War I †

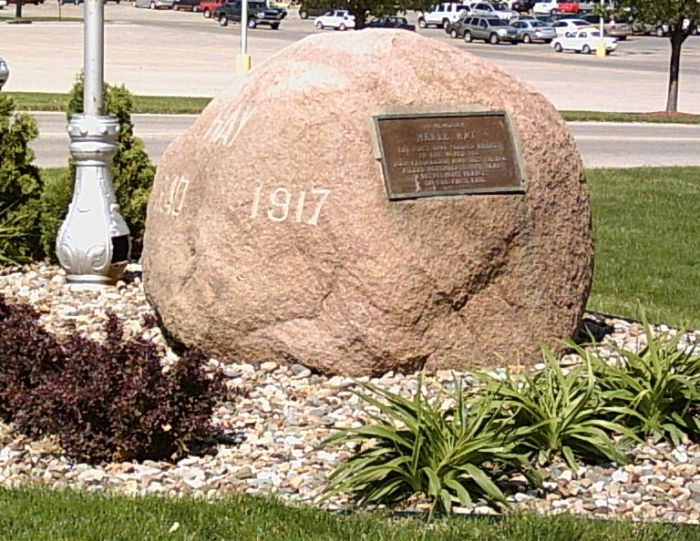
Merle Hay memorial boulder in Des Moines, Iowa

Merle David Hay (July 20, 1896 – November 3, 1917) was the first Iowa serviceman, and perhaps the first American serviceman to die in combat while assigned to an American unit, in World War I, along with Corporal James Bethel Gresham of Evansville, Indiana and Thomas Enright of Pittsburgh, Pennsylvania.

== Early life ==
Merle Hay was born on a Carroll County, Iowa, farm to Harvey and Carrie Hay. He was the oldest of three children. In 1909, the family moved to another farm near Glidden. Before his service with the United States Army, he was a farm implement mechanic.

== World War I service ==
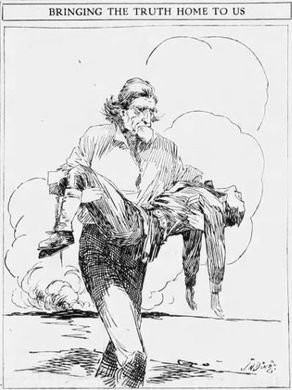
Cartoon published in the November 8, 1917, issue of the Des Moines Register; Uncle Sam brings home the body. A copy of the cartoon would be placed on a monument to Hay in Glidden.

When the United States entered the First World War, Hay was young enough to avoid being drafted. With his father's blessing, he voluntarily enlisted on May 9, 1917. He was among eight men from Glidden who enlisted that day.

They were first shipped to Fort Logan, Colorado, then to Fort Bliss in El Paso, Texas. He was assigned to the 16th Infantry Regiment. On 26 June 1917, the regiment disembarked the troop ships in St. Nazaire, France, as part of the 1st Infantry Division. By November 1917, he was assigned to Company F along with Corporal James Bethel Gresham and Private Thomas Enright. They were posted in the trenches of position 'Artois' near the French village of Bathelémont in Lorraine. In the early morning of 3 November 1917, the Imperial German Army attacked. After an hour of fighting, Hay, Corporal Gresham, and Private Enright were the first three casualties of the American Expeditionary Force.

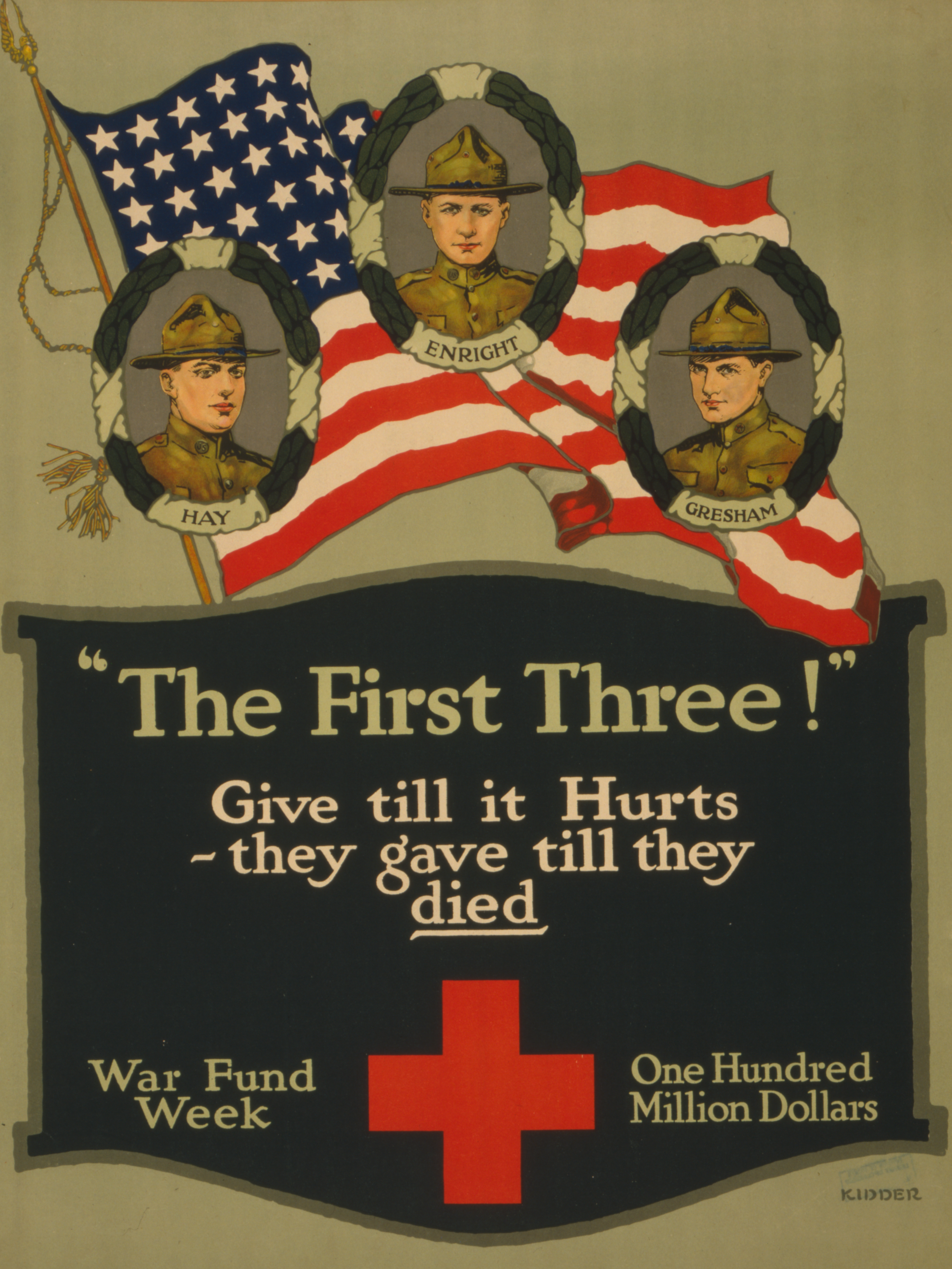
First three American soldiers to die fighting in World War I, Merle Hay, Thomas Enright and James Bethel Gresham 1917 poster

Two days later, on 5 November 1917, Enright, Gresham, and Hay were buried near the battlefield where they had died. An inscription marked their graves: "Here lie the first soldiers of the illustrious Republic of the United States who fell on French soil for justice and liberty." Their bodies were eventually returned to their families and reburied in the United States. Hay was then re-interred in July 1921 in West Lawn Cemetery in his home town of Glidden, Iowa. The West Lawn Cemetery was later renamed the Merle Hay Memorial Cemetery. An 8-foot monument commissioned by the Iowa Legislature marks his gravesite.

Shortly after Hay's death, the highway running from the west edge of Des Moines to Camp Dodge was renamed Merle Hay Road. A memorial boulder was placed along Merle Hay Road in 1923 and remains up today amidst the commercial development along the road. Merle Hay Mall in Des Moines was also named for Hay; the local Kiwanis club placed a memorial plaque near the entrance to the mall's Sears store in 1979.

The first American military casualty in World War II was also an Iowa native. Robert M. Losey, a military attache, was killed on April 21, 1940, during a German bombardment of Dombås, Norway.

== Family ==
Hay's mother collapsed upon hearing of his death but in an interview two days later Hay's father, D. Hay, said that "I am proud of my boy if he has given up his life for his country." He had a younger brother Basil and sister Opel.

== See also ==
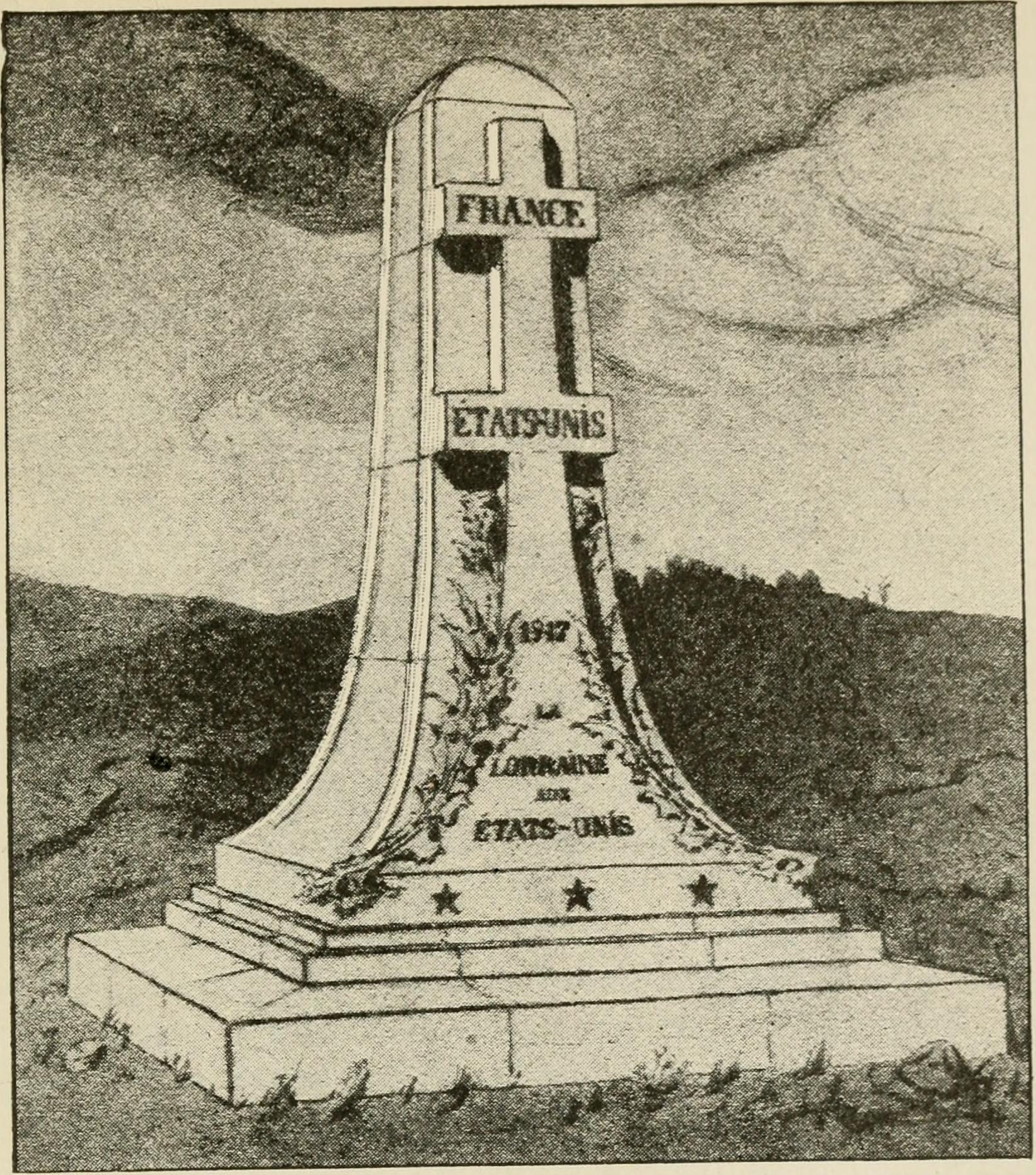
Monument to James B. Gresham, Merle D. Hay and Thomas F. Enright, designed by Louis Majorelle, erected November 1918 in Bathelémont, destroyed by the Germans in October 1940

=== First soldiers killed in World War I ===
- Albert Mayer, the first soldier and first Imperial German Army soldier killed, August 2, 1914
- Jules-André Peugeot, the first French Army soldier killed, August 2, 1914
- Antoine Fonck, the first Belgian Army soldier killed, August 4, 1914
- John Parr, the first British Army soldier killed, August 21, 1914
- Thomas Enright, one of the first three American Army soldiers killed, November 3, 1917
- James Bethel Gresham, one of the first three American Army soldiers killed, November 3, 1917

=== Last soldiers killed in World War I ===
- George Edwin Ellison, the last British Army soldier killed, at 9:30 a.m. November 11, 1918
- Augustin Trébuchon, the last French Army soldier killed, at 10:45 a.m. November 11, 1918
- Marcel Toussaint Terfve, the last Belgian Army soldier killed, at 10:45 a.m. November 11, 1918
- George Lawrence Price, the last Canadian Army soldier killed, at 10:58 a.m. November 11, 1918
- Henry Gunther, the last soldier and last American Army soldier killed, at 10:59 a.m. November 11, 1918

== Bibliography ==
Notes

References

- Cleverley, J. Michael (December 2003). "The First American Official Killed In This War" (PDF). Foreign Service Journal. 2003 (December). American Foreign Service Association: 66–68. ISSN 0146-3543.
- Connors, Michael (November 11, 2007). "The Next Page: Finding Private Enright". Pittsburgh Post-Gazette.
- Evening Public Ledger pg1 (November 5, 1917). "Casualty List In First Action Thrills Nation". Evening Public Ledger. Philadelphia: Cyrus H. K. Curtis. pp. 1–22. ISSN 2151-3945. LCCN 83045211. OCLC 9355469.
- Evening Public Ledger pg7 (November 5, 1917). "Proud to have given son to Nation's cause". Evening Public Ledger. Philadelphia: Cyrus H. K. Curtis. pp. 1–22. ISSN 2151-3945. LCCN 83045211. OCLC 9355469.
- The Glidden Graphic (November 8, 1917). "Glidden Boy First American Killed in France" (PDF). The Glidden Graphic. ISSN 0746-6196. OCLC 10164185.
- Strong, Jared (2006-03-24). "Veterans cast light on memorial". The Des Moines Register. p. 3B.
