= Marcel Toussaint Terfve =

Last Belgian soldier killed in WWI

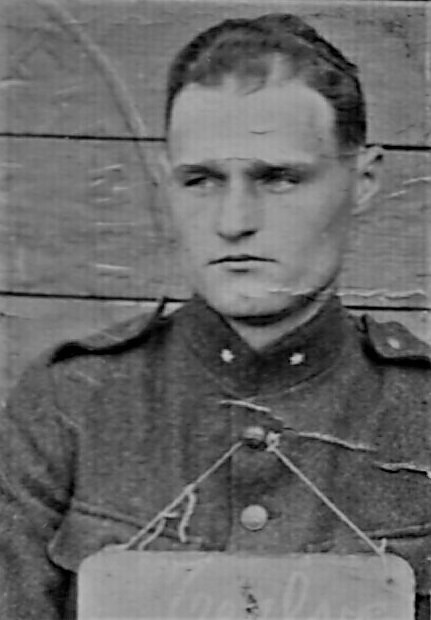
- Born: December 2, 1893; Liège, Liège Province, Belgium
- Died: November 11, 1918 (aged 24); Kluizen, East Flanders, Belgium
- Military career
- Allegiance: Belgium
- Branch: Belgian Land Component
- Rank: Corporal
- Unit: 1st Line Regiment
- Conflicts: World War I †; Race to the Sea; Battle of the Yser

Marcel Toussaint Louis Joseph Terfve (December 2, 1893 – November 11, 1918) was a Belgian corporal of World War I. He was known as the last Belgian soldier to be killed in the war, dying at 10:45 a.m, a quarter of an hour before the Armistice of 11 November 1918 took effect.

== Biography ==
Marcel Terfve was born in Liège on December 2, 1893. His father, Gilles, was an aspiring notary and his mother, French, Marie-Jeanne Drapier, was unemployed. Single, Terfve was an insurance inspector before the start of World War I. In 1914, he volunteered and was enlisted in the 1st Line Regiment within the 3rd company. Within the 1st Line Regiment, he was stationed upon the defenses at the Gete at the Battle of the Yser in October 1914. After the fall of Diksmuide, Terfve spent the next 3 years within the trenches.

Terfve then traveled to France to study to become a non-commissioned officer and graduated as a warrant officer and he initially wanted to become a second lieutenant but he asked for his demotion to remain a corporal within his unit. On November 11, 1918, the first regiment joined the left bank of the Ghent–Terneuzen Canal within the vicinity of Kluizen. At 6:40 a.m., the 1st Line Regiment received a notice from the high command informing that a ceasefire would take place at 11 a.m. This message is confirmed at 9:08. An officer notes, however, the German forces retained their machine guns on the right bank of the canal. At 10:42 a.m., three soldiers were mowed down by machine gun fire on the edge of the canal. Two were seriously injured and Terfve himself received a bullet which punctured his left lung. Despite the regiment's best efforts to mend his wound, at 10.45 am, Terfve died, a quarter of an hour before the Armistice of 11 November 1918 went into effect.

== Legacy ==
Terfve was first buried in Eeklo. He was then re-interred thereafter in the cemetery of Mons-lez-Liège on May 31, 1921.

There is currently no monument in memory of Terfve as there is for Antoine Fonck, the first Belgian soldier to die on August 4, 1914. His burial also seems not to have been preserved.

There is everything in the short life of this young man. The obvious courage of his voluntary commitment, the solidarity expressed by his decision not to rise in rank to remain in contact with his comrades in the unit and, of course, the horror of the war which still killed until the last moments. Without necessity. Arbitrarily. At the chance of a useless shot and a moment of recklessness. All of us could have been this Marcel Terfve or one of the approximately 40,000 other Belgian soldiers who died between 1914 and 1918.

== See also ==
- Antoine Fonck, the first Belgian Land Component soldier killed, 1914
- Jules-André Peugeot, the first French Army soldier killed, 1914
- John Parr, the first British Army soldier killed, 1914
- Thomas Enright, one of the first three American Army soldiers killed, 1917
- Merle Hay, one of the first three American Army soldiers killed, 1917
- James Bethel Gresham, one of the first three American Army soldiers killed, 1917
- George Edwin Ellison, the last British soldier killed in World War I, at 9:30 a.m. 11 November
- George Lawrence Price, the last Canadian soldier killed in World War I, 10:58 a.m. 11 November.
- Augustin Trébuchon, the last French soldier killed in World War I, 10:45 a.m. November 11, 1918
- Henry Gunther, the last soldier killed in World War I, 10:59 a.m. November 11, 1918
