= James Bethel Gresham =

American soldier (1893–1917)

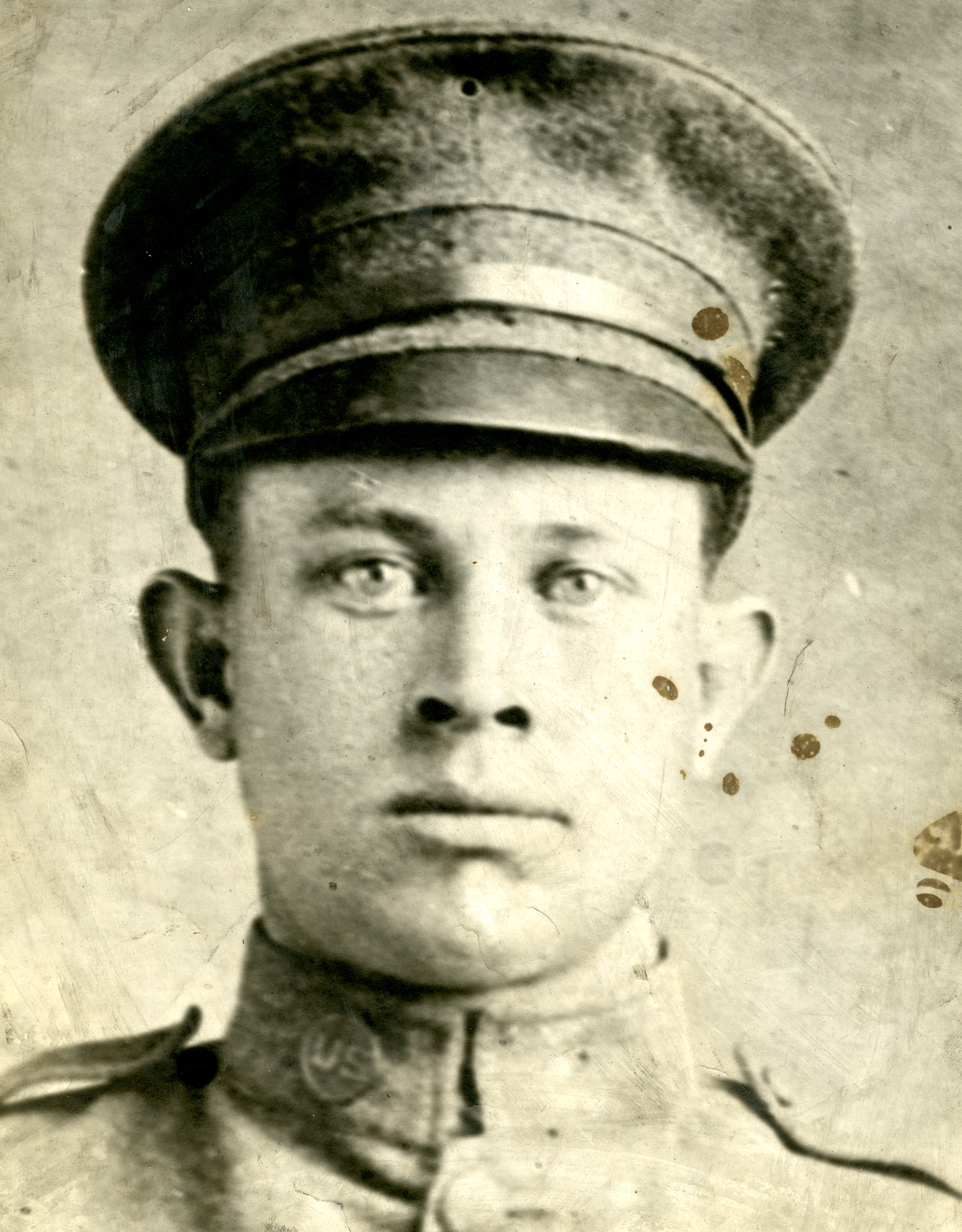
- Born: August 23, 1893; McLean County, Kentucky, U.S.
- Died: November 3, 1917 (aged 24); Lorraine, France
- Burial place: Locust Hill Cemetery, Evansville, Indiana, U.S.
- Military career
- Allegiance: United States
- Branch: United States Army
- Service years: 1914–17
- Rank: Corporal
- Units: 16th Infantry Regiment, 1st Infantry Division
- Conflicts: World War I †

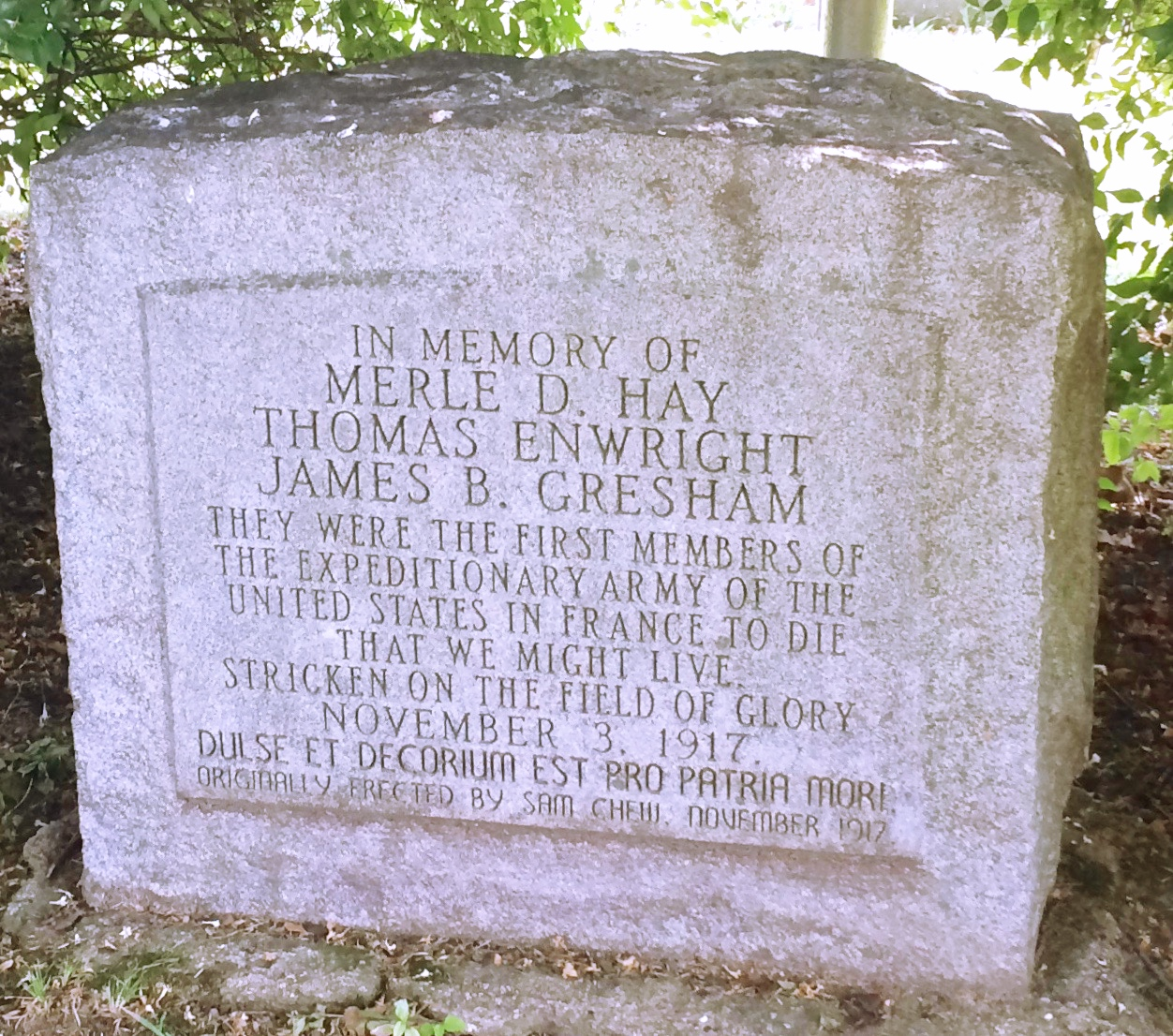
Monument at the Crawford County Courthouse in Van Buren, Arkansas

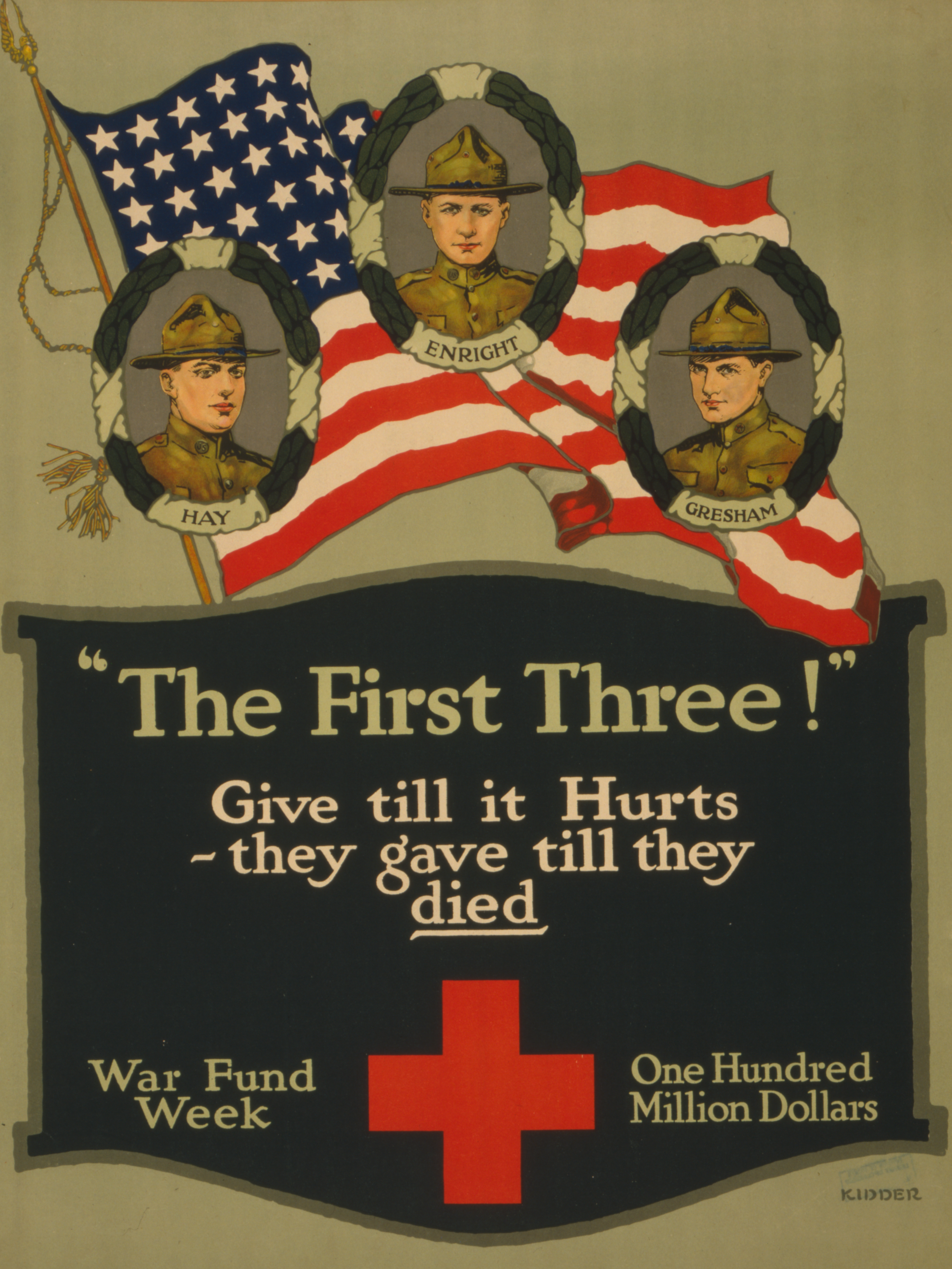
First three American soldiers to die fighting in World War I, Merle Hay, Thomas Enright and James Bethel Gresham 1917 poster

James Bethel Gresham (August 23, 1893 – November 3, 1917) was an American soldier who was the first Hoosier serviceman, and perhaps the first American serviceman to die in combat while assigned to an American unit, World War I, along with Private Merle Hay of Glidden, Iowa and Private Thomas Enright of Pittsburgh, Pennsylvania.

== Early life ==
James Gresham was born on August 23, 1893, in McLean County, Kentucky. In September 1901, his family moved to Evansville, Indiana, where he attended the Centennial School and he later worked in local furniture factories.

== Military service, death, and legacy ==
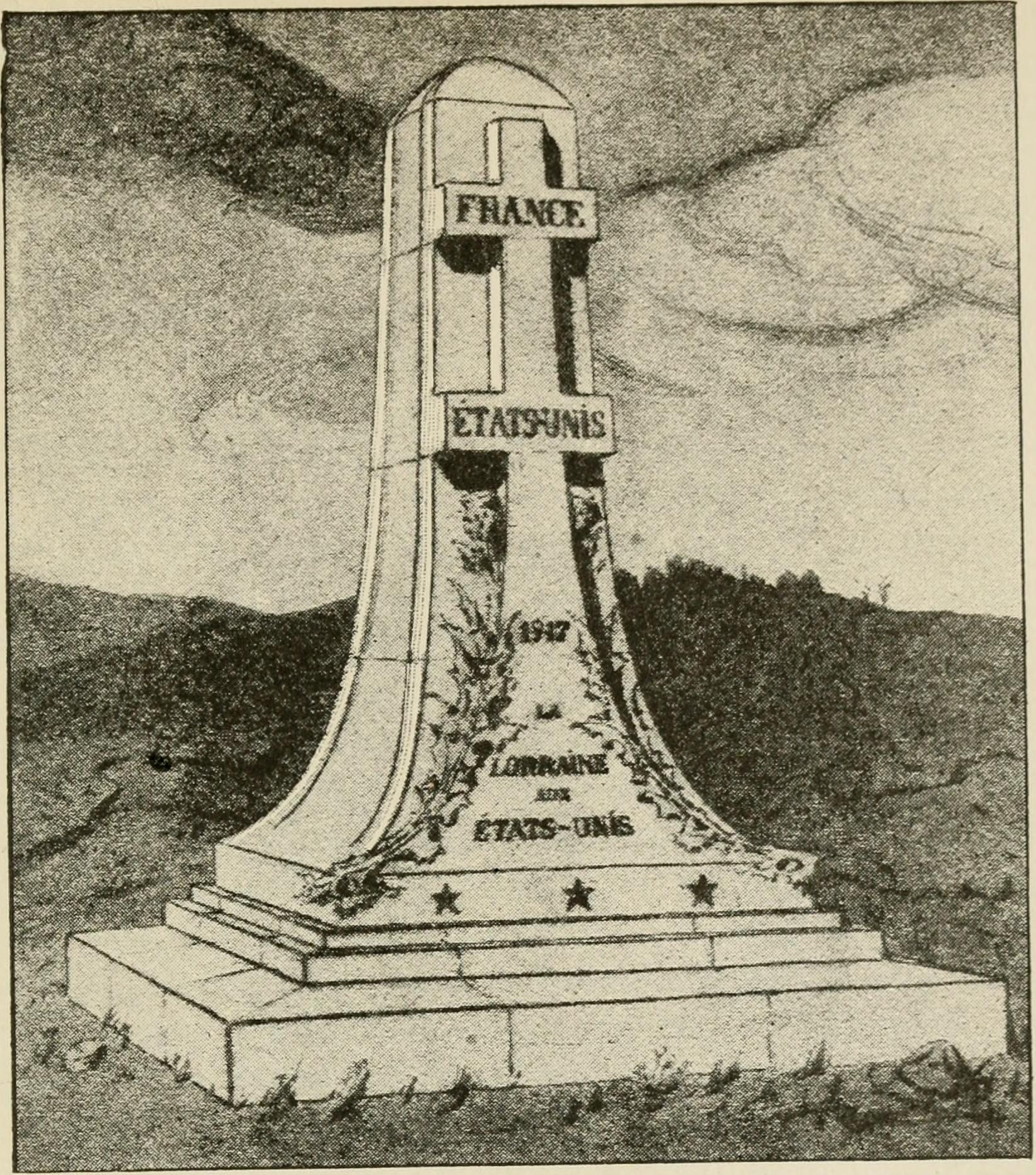
Monument to James B. Gresham, Merle D. Hay and Thomas F. Enright, designed by Louis Majorelle, erected November 1918 in Bathelémont, destroyed by the Germans in October 1940

Gresham enlisted into the U.S. Army on April 23, 1914, with his service beginning at Jefferson Barracks, St. Louis, Missouri. By June 1914, he was serving in El Paso, Texas under General John J. Pershing. With the 16th Infantry Regiment, he shipped out from Fort Bliss for France with the first American soldiers of the American Expeditionary Force in June 1917. Just before daylight on November 3, 1917, Gresham was killed along with Privates Hay and Enright during an early morning raid by the Imperial German Army near Bathelémont in Lorraine, France, at a defensive position codenamed 'Artois'. Two days later, on 5 November 1917, Enright, Gresham, and Hay were buried near the battlefield where they had died. An inscription marked their graves: "Here lie the first soldiers of the illustrious Republic of the United States who fell on French soil for justice and liberty." Later in 1921, the body was moved to its current resting place in Evansville, Indiana. As a memorial, as the first American casualty of World War I, a house in Evansville was built in his honor and given to his mother, Alice Dodd.

== See also ==
=== First soldiers killed in World War I ===
- Albert Mayer, the first soldier and first Imperial German Army soldier killed, August 2, 1914
- Jules-André Peugeot, the first French Army soldier killed, August 2, 1914
- Antoine Fonck, the first Belgian Army soldier killed, August 4, 1914
- John Parr, the first British Army soldier killed, August 21, 1914
- Thomas Enright, one of the first three American Army soldiers killed, November 3, 1917
- Merle Hay, one of the first three American Army soldiers killed, November 3, 1917

=== Last soldiers killed in World War I ===
- George Edwin Ellison, the last British Army soldier killed, at 9:30 a.m. November 11, 1918
- Augustin Trébuchon, the last French Army soldier killed, at 10:45 a.m. November 11, 1918
- Marcel Toussaint Terfve, the last Belgian Army soldier killed, at 10:45 a.m. November 11, 1918
- George Lawrence Price, the last Canadian Army soldier killed, at 10:58 a.m. November 11, 1918
- Henry Gunther, the last soldier and last American Army soldier killed, at 10:59 a.m. November 11, 1918
