= Antoine Fonck =

First Belgian soldier killed in WWI

Antoine-Adolphe Fonck
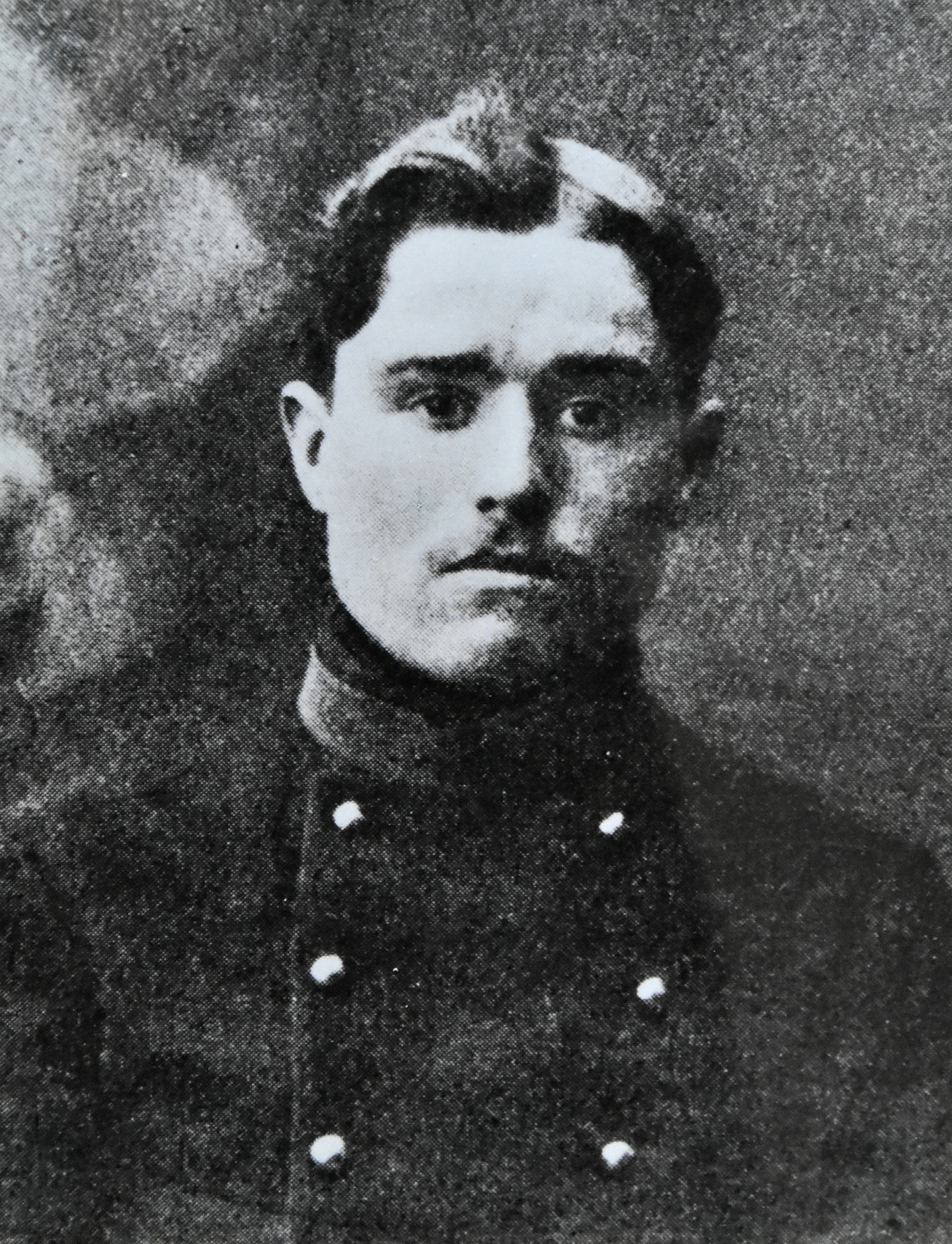
- Born: 10 January 1893; Verviers, Liège Province, Belgium
- Died: 4 August 1914 (aged 21); Thimister, Liège Province, Belgium
- Burial place: Thimister-Clermont Communal Cemetery; 50.65719°N 5.86642°E
- Military career
- Allegiance: Belgium
- Branch: Belgian Land Component
- Unit: 2nd Lancer Regiment
- Known for: First Belgian soldier to be killed in World War I
- Conflicts: World War I †

Antoine Adolphe Fonck (10 January 1893 – 4 August 1914) was a Belgian cavalryman in the 2nd Lancer Regiment. He was killed during a reconnaissance patrol on the first day of the German invasion of Belgium and is regarded as the first Belgian serviceman killed in World War I.

== Early life and military service ==
Fonck was born in Verviers on 10 January 1893. Orphaned at a young age, he was raised in Liège by his grandmother. After leaving school, he worked as a warehouse clerk at the Grand Bazar of Liège.

In 1911, aged 18, Fonck enlisted as a volunteer in the 2nd Lancer Regiment for a three-year term. He returned to civilian life in May 1914, but was recalled on 28 July as the Belgian Army increased its state of readiness during the July Crisis.

== Death ==
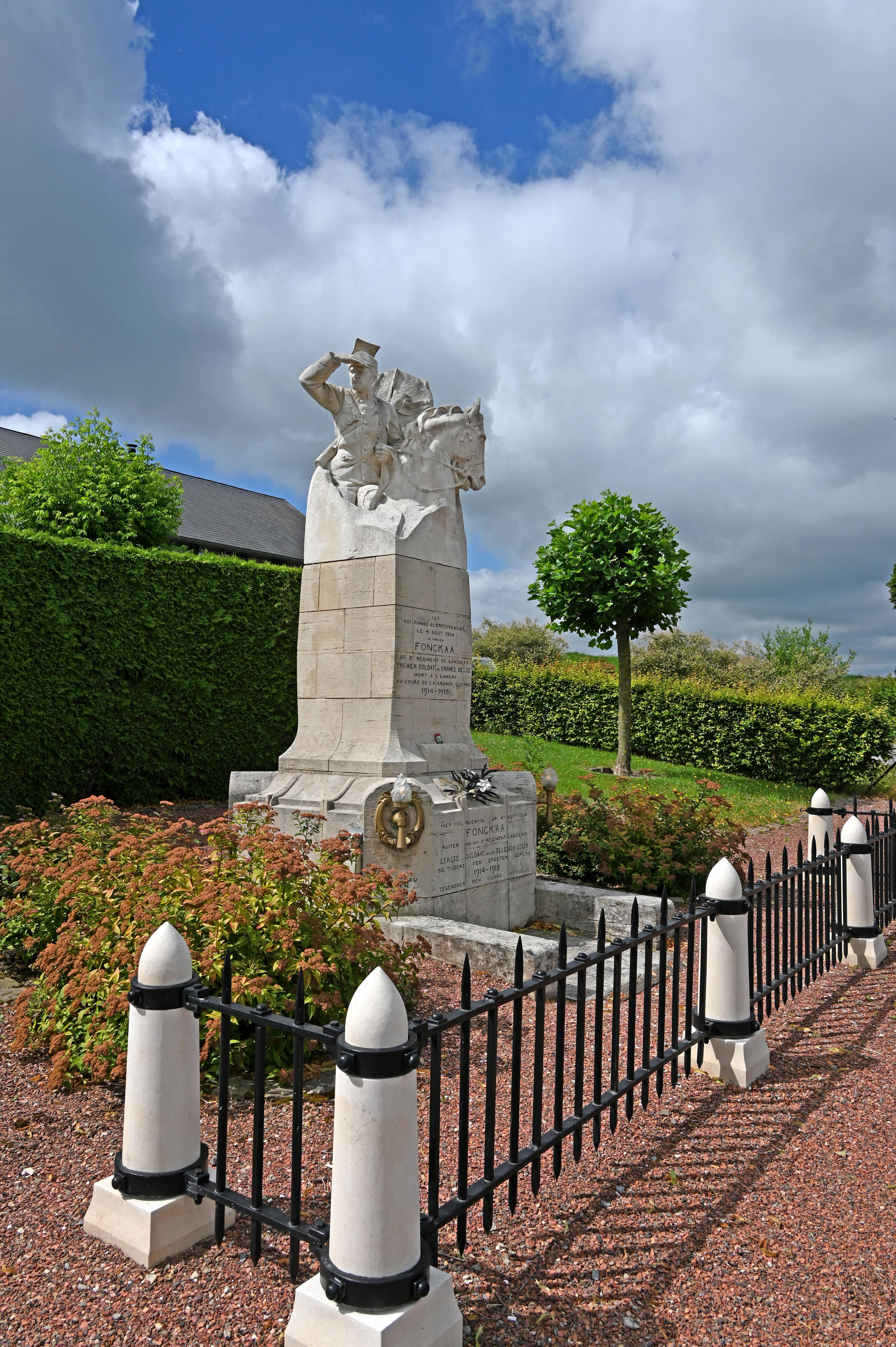
Monument to Fonck at La Croix Polinard

On 2 August 1914, the 2nd Lancers left their garrison in Liège for their mobilisation quarters at Milmort. The regiment was ordered to establish a surveillance network towards Battice, near the German frontier. On the morning of 4 August, Fonck was part of a reconnaissance patrol sent towards Henri-Chapelle. Riding ahead of the other cavalrymen, he encountered German troops near the hamlet of La Croix Polinard at Thimister.

In the commonly accepted account of the encounter, Fonck dismounted, tied his horse to a barrier and fired on a group of five or six German cavalrymen, killing one. He then remounted, but the German soldiers regrouped and returned fire. His horse was shot and fell, after which Fonck attempted to escape on foot. He was struck in the back of the neck and killed at about 10 a.m.

His body was recovered by local residents and taken to the municipal building in Thimister. An official funeral was held on 6 August, after which he was buried in the communal cemetery, where he remains interred.

== Commemoration ==
After the war, the Caserne des Écoliers in Liège, where the 2nd Lancers had been stationed, was renamed the Caserne Cavalier Fonck in his memory.

In 1923, a monument sculpted by Marcel Rau was erected at La Croix Polinard, near the site of Fonck's death. Its inscription identifies him as the first soldier of the Belgian Army killed by the enemy during World War I. A commemoration is held at the monument each year in early August.

== See also ==
=== First soldiers killed in World War I ===
- Albert Mayer, the first soldier and first Imperial German Army soldier killed, 2 August 1914
- Jules-André Peugeot, the first French Army soldier killed, 2 August 1914
- John Parr, the first British Army soldier killed, 21 August 1914
- Thomas Enright, one of the first three American Army soldiers killed, 3 November 1917
- Merle Hay, one of the first three American Army soldiers killed, 3 November 1917
- James Bethel Gresham, one of the first three American Army soldiers killed, 3 November 1917

=== Last soldiers killed in World War I ===
- George Edwin Ellison, the last British Army soldier killed, at 9:30 a.m., 11 November 1918
- Augustin Trébuchon, the last French Army soldier killed, at 10:45 a.m., 11 November 1918
- Marcel Toussaint Terfve, the last Belgian Army soldier killed, at 10:45 a.m., 11 November 1918
- George Lawrence Price, the last Canadian Army soldier killed, at 10:58 a.m., 11 November 1918
- Henry Gunther, the last soldier and last American Army soldier killed, at 10:59 a.m., 11 November 1918
