= Augustin Trébuchon =

Last French soldier killed in World War I

Augustin-Joseph Victorin Trébuchon
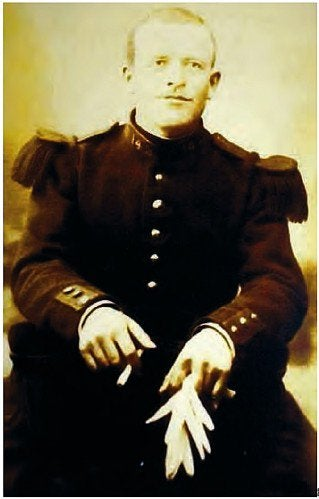
- Trébuchon during World War I
- Born: 30 May 1878; Montchabrier, France
- Died: 11 November 1918 (aged 40); Vrigne-Meuse, Ardenne, France
- Military career
- Allegiance: France
- Branch: French Army
- Service years: 1914-1918
- Rank: Private first class
- Units: 415th Infantry Regiment, 163rd Infantry Division
- Known for: Killed in the Battle of Vrigne-Meuse, last French soldier killed during World War I
- Conflicts: World War I; Western Front; First Battle of the Marne; Third Battle of Artois; Battle of Verdun; Battle of the Somme; Battle of Vrigne-Meuse †

Augustin-Joseph Victorin Trébuchon (French pronunciation: [oɡystɛ̃ ʒozɛf viktɔʁɛ̃ tʁebyʃɔ̃]; 30 May 1878 – 11 November 1918) was the last French soldier killed during World War I. He was shot 15 minutes before the Armistice came into effect, at 10:45 am on 11 November 1918. The French Army, embarrassed to have sent men into battle after the armistice with the Germans had been signed, recorded the date of his death as earlier by one day.

== Biography ==
Augustin Trébuchon was born at Montchabrier (near Le Malzieu-Ville in the Lozère) on 30 May 1878, with four younger brothers and sisters. His mother died when he was young and his father nine years later. He had been in the army since the war began in 1914. He was a communal shepherd and played accordion at village marriages before volunteering for the army on 4 August 1914. He joined the 415th Infantry Regiment as a messenger. He had already served in the second battle of the Marne and at Verdun, Artois and the Somme before arriving in the Ardennes at the end of the war. He had twice been wounded, including a severe wound to his left arm caused by an exploding artillery shell. Upon his promotion to the rank of Soldat de Première Classe (Private First Class) in September 1918 it was said that he was "a good soldier having always achieved his duty, of remarkable calm, setting the best example to his young comrades."

Trébuchon, as a messenger, knew an agreement had been signed before the rest of his unit. At Vrigne-sur-Meuse, in the Ardennes, the 163rd Infantry Division was ordered to attack an élite German unit, the Hannetons. General Henri Gouraud told his men to cross the Meuse and to attack "as fast as possible, by whatever means and regardless of cost". It has been speculated that the attack was to end any possible hesitations by German negotiators at Compiègne, that Maréchal Foch believed the Germans were reluctant to sign and so ordered Général Philippe Pétain to press on across the Meuse.

Trébuchon was halfway between Sedan and Charleville-Mézières. Rain was falling and the Meuse was flooding. Its width was put at 70 m. The temperature was well below freezing. Warfare had destroyed bridges across the river and sappers worked by night and in fog to build a plank footbridge across a lock. There had been no reconnaissance of the other bank because bad weather had kept the spotter plane on the ground. Around 700 men crossed the river a little after 8:00 am, taking a telephone wire with them. Some fell in the river and the first deaths were by drowning.

The fog cleared at 10:30 am and the French could see German soldiers installed a little higher than them, a few hundred metres away. The French were spread over three kilometres between the Meuse and a railway line. The Germans opened fire with machine guns. The French sent up a spotter plane now that the fog had lifted and the artillery on the other bank could open fire without fear of killing their own side. Darkness fell again at 6pm and the battle continued until news of the armistice arrived.

The last of the 91 French soldiers to die was Trébuchon, "with a red hole in his right side", probably a figure of speech as this expression comes from Arthur Rimbaud's very famous poem "Le Dormeur du Val" (The Sleeper in the Valley). He was 40. He fell near the railway line with his message still in his hand. It read "Rassemblement à 11h 30 pour le ravitaillement – "Muster at 11.30 for food." The armistice followed and the French withdrew without honouring their dead.

== Memorial and burial ==
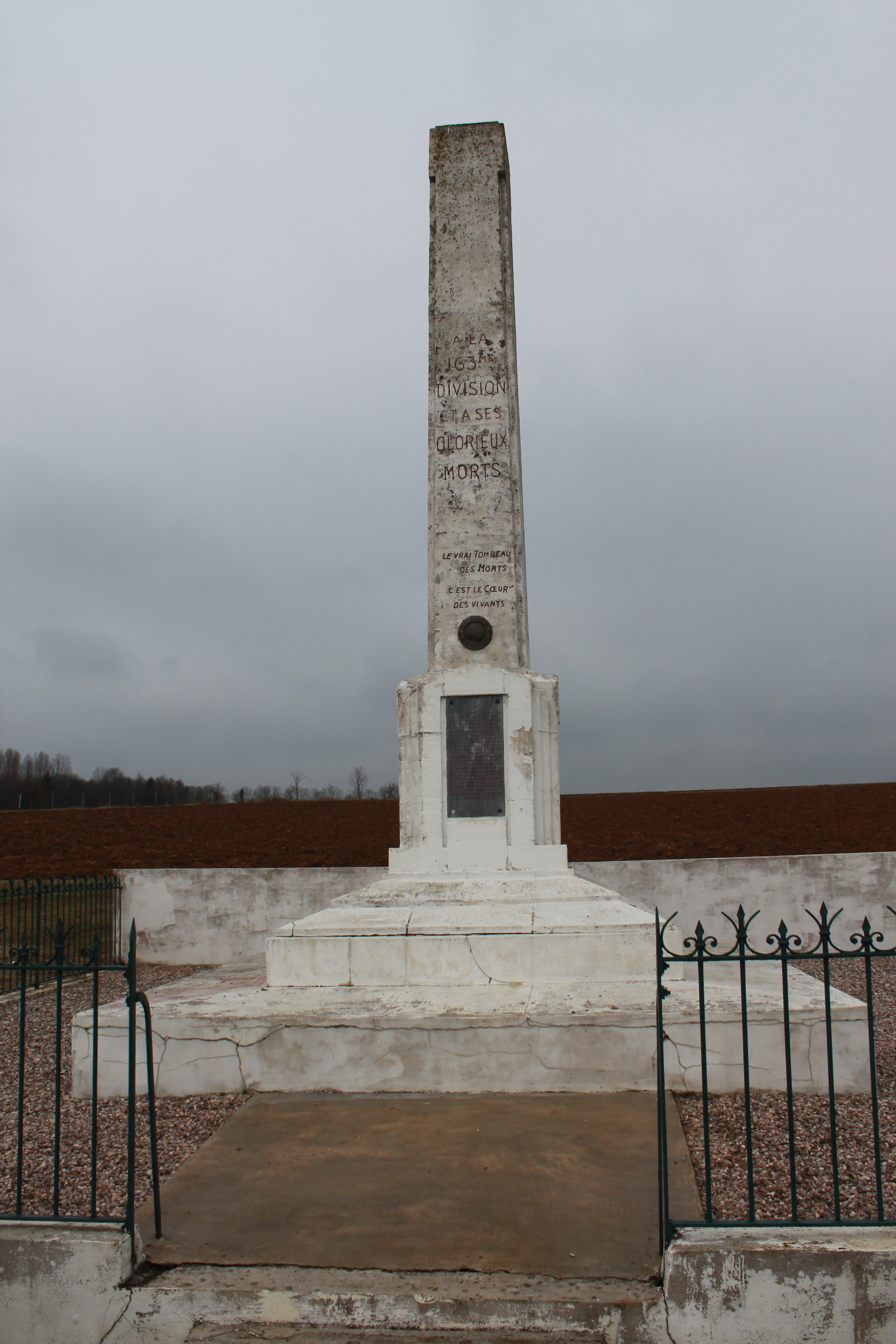
Memorial of the 163rd infantry division at Vrigne-Meuse.

Trébuchon is buried in grave 13 at the cemetery at Vrigne-Meuse.

Trébuchon remained unrecognised until a retired breeder, René Fuselier, began inquiring in 1998 into the identity of the last poilu to die. He said: "With the computer facilities that we have today, it was easy to find out about him and others of the past."

The date on his memorial at Malzieu-Forain and in the village records is 10 November 1918. The Germans had asked for an armistice on 9 November and it came into effect on 11 November. Nobody knows who ordered the death date to be changed, but it is said to be so for all French soldiers who died on 11 November. Speculation that the army was ashamed of sending men into battle knowing the armistice had already been agreed grew when the 415th Infantry Regiment was not invited to the victory parade through Paris on 14 July 1919.

Trébuchon is named on the village memorial as Victorin—his second given name—rather than Augustin.

A street at Vrigne-Meuse, where he died and where he is buried with 17 colleagues in the cemetery, has been named after him.

== See also ==
=== First soldiers killed in World War I ===
- Albert Mayer, the first soldier and first Imperial German Army soldier killed, 2 August 1914
- Jules-André Peugeot, the first French Army soldier killed, 2 August 1914
- Antoine Fonck, the first Belgian Army soldier killed, 4 August 1914
- John Parr, the first British Army soldier killed, 21 August 1914
- Thomas Enright, one of the first three American Army soldiers killed, 3 November 1917
- Merle Hay, one of the first three American Army soldiers killed, 3 November 1917
- James Bethel Gresham, one of the first three American Army soldiers killed, 3 November 1917

=== Last soldiers killed in World War I ===
- George Edwin Ellison, the last British Army soldier killed, at 9:30 a.m. 11 November 1918
- Marcel Toussaint Terfve, the last Belgian Army soldier killed, at 10:45 a.m. 11 November 1918
- George Lawrence Price, the last Canadian Army soldier killed, at 10:58 a.m. 11 November 1918
- Henry Gunther, the last soldier and last American Army soldier killed, at 10:59 a.m. 11 November 1918
