= John Parr (British Army soldier) =

First British soldier killed in WWI

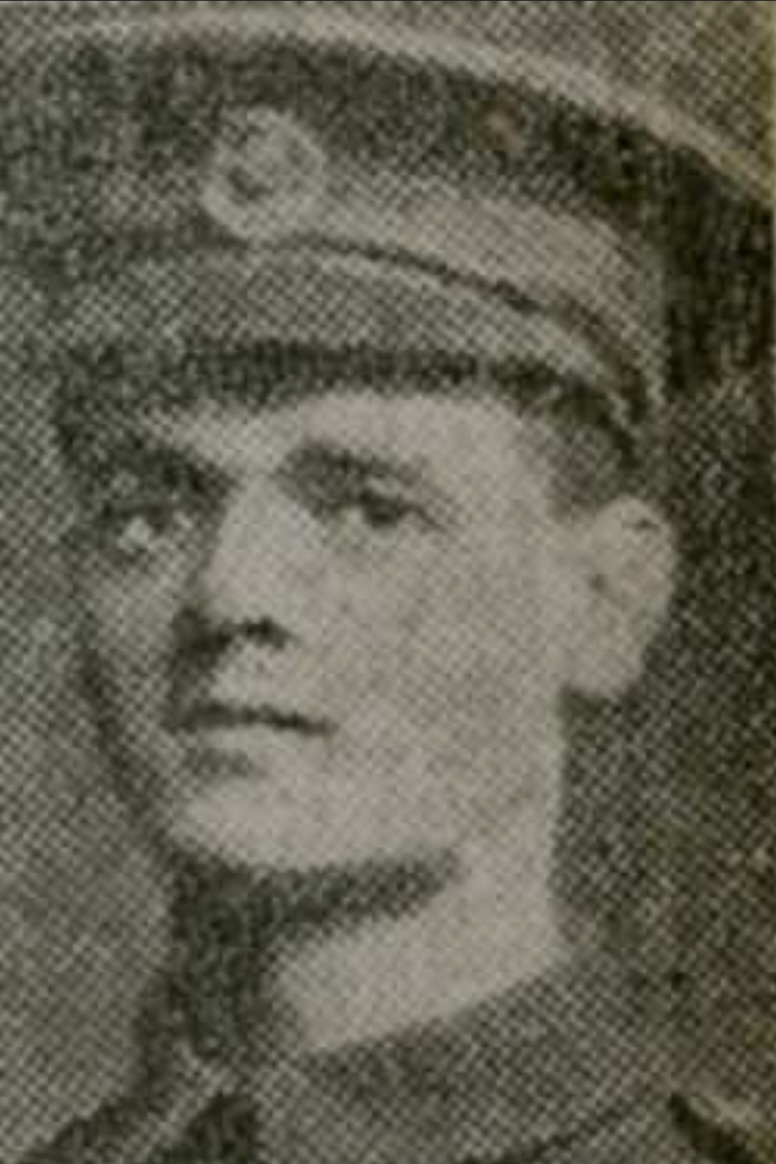
- Private John Parr in Barnsley in 1914
- Born: John Henry Parr; 19 July 1897; Church End, Finchley, London, England
- Died: 21 August 1914 (aged 17); Obourg, Belgium
- Burial place: St Symphorien Military Cemetery, Belgium
- Military career
- Allegiance: United Kingdom
- Branch: British Army
- Service years: 1912–1914
- Rank: Private
- Nickname: "Ole Parr"
- Service number: 14196
- Unit: (Duke of Cambridge's) Middlesex Regiment
- Conflicts: World War I †

John Henry Parr (30 July 1897 – 21 August 1914) was a British soldier. He is believed to be the first soldier of the British Empire to be killed during World War I.

== Early life ==
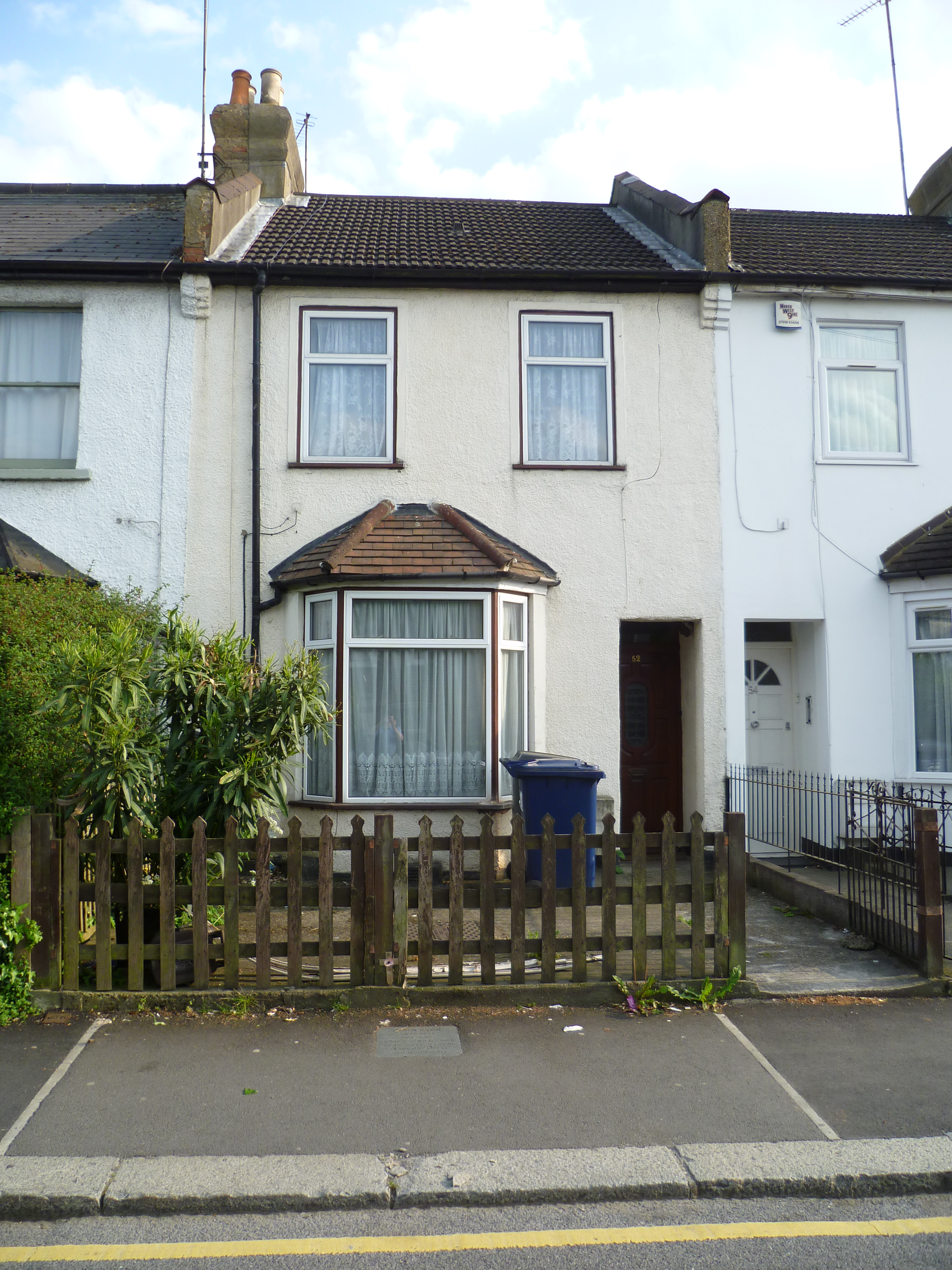
Parr's former home in Lodge Lane, Finchley.

Parr was born to Edward and Alice Parr at Lichfield Grove, Finchley, now in the London Borough of Barnet but then in the historic County of Middlesex. His father was a milkman. He lived most of his life at 52 Lodge Lane, North Finchley. Many of his siblings died before their fourth birthday.

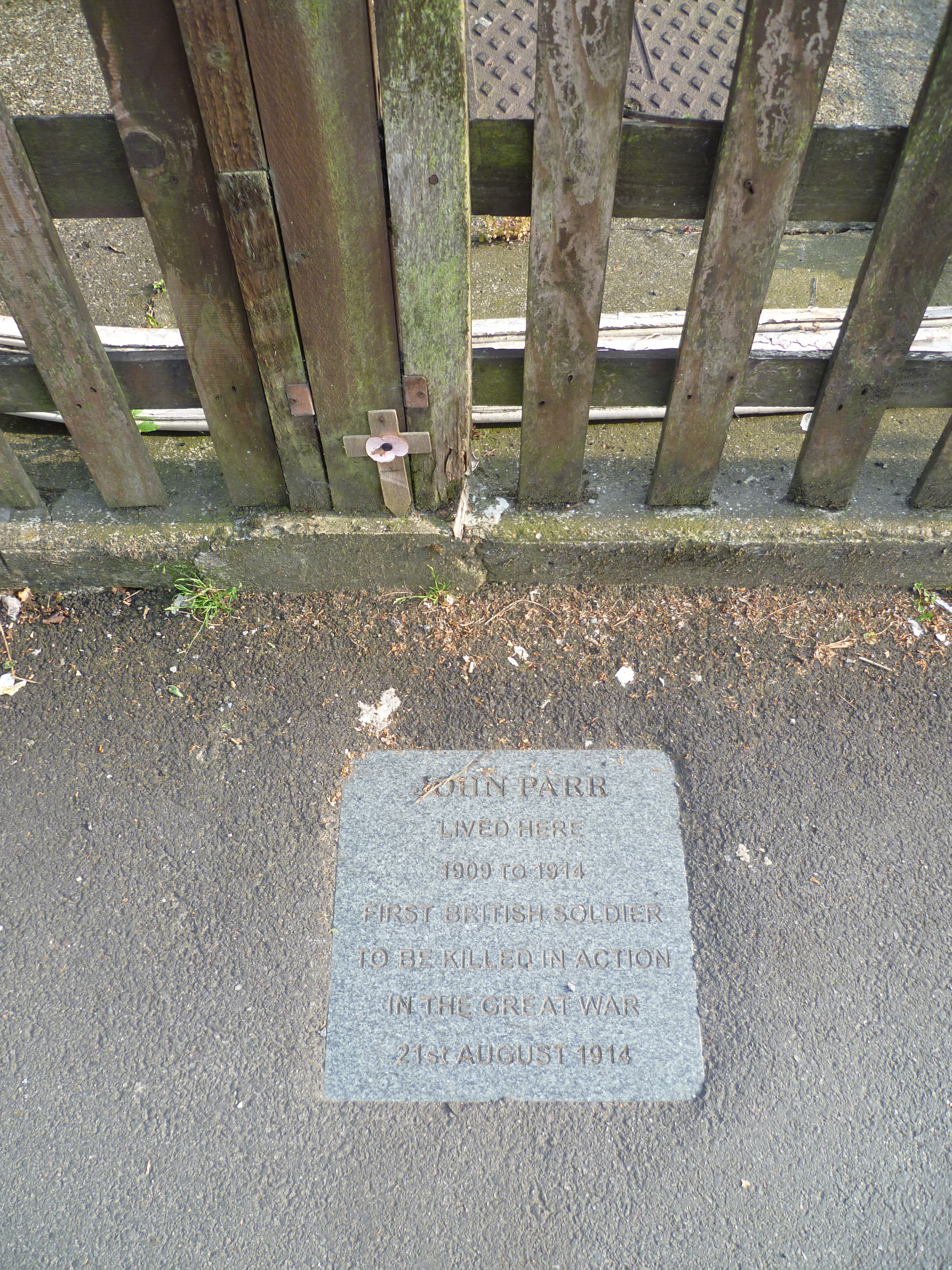
The plaque to Parr's memory in Lodge Lane, Finchley.

Upon leaving school, he took a job working as a butcher's boy, and then as a caddie at North Middlesex Golf Club. Then, like many other young men at the time, he was attracted to the British Army as a potentially better way of life, and one where he would at least get two meals a day and a chance to see the world. Parr, who was only 5 ft 3 in (1.60 m) tall, joined the 4th Battalion of the Middlesex Regiment as a professional soldier in 1912, aged fifteen, but claimed to be eighteen years and one month old to meet the minimum age requirement. He was nicknamed "Ole Parr", possibly after Old Tom Parr.

== Military service ==
Parr became an infantry scout with the 4th Middlesex, whose role was to ride ahead of the battalion on the march with a detachment mounted upon bicycles to detect the enemy, or points of military note, and then return with all possible speed to notify the Battalion's Commanding Officer as to what lay ahead.

On the outbreak of the World War I in early August 1914 the 4th Middlesex was mobilized, and was among the first British Army units of the British Expeditionary Force (BEF) to cross the English Channel to France. With the Imperial German Army invading Belgium and France at that moment, Parr's unit took up positions near the village of Bettignies, beside the canal running through the town of Mons, approximately 8 miles (13 km) away.

On 21 August 1914, Parr and another cyclist were sent to the village of Obourg, just northeast of Mons, and slightly over the border in Belgium, with orders to locate where the Germans were. It is believed that whilst doing this they encountered an Uhlan patrol from the German First Army engaged in the same work, and that Parr remained to hold off the enemy whilst his companion returned to report. He was killed in an exchange of rifle fire aged 17.

The exact circumstances of his death remain unclear, and historical research in 2014 has posited the theory that he may have been killed by friendly fire rather than that from a German patrol as previously thought, or during the Battle of Mons on 23 August 1914.

As the British Army retreated from the area shortly afterwards, Parr's body was left behind, and with the absence of confirmation of his fate Parr's death was not officially recognised until much later in the conflict. His mother wrote to his regiment's headquarters asking about her son, but it was unable to state with certainty what had happened to him.

== Grave ==
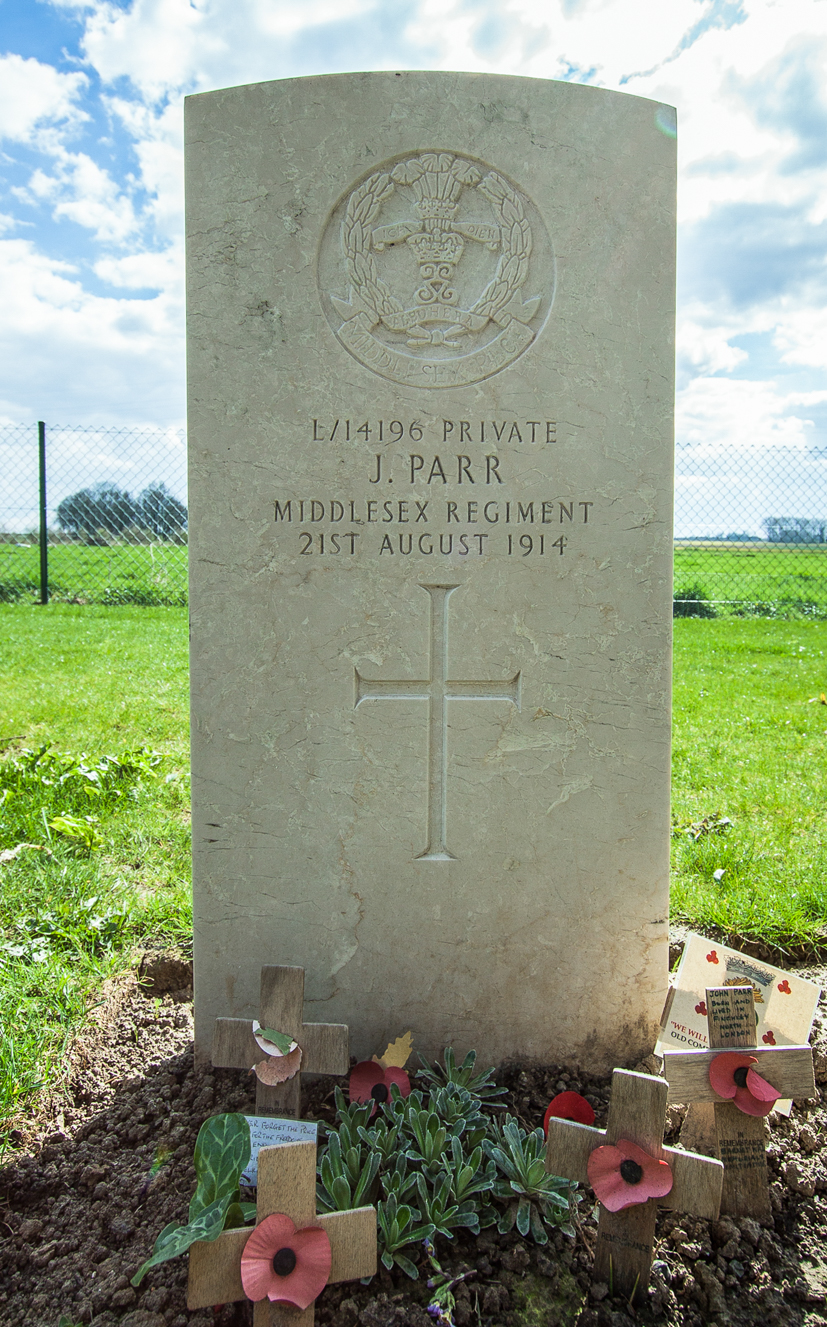
Grave of Private John Parr in St Symphorien Military Cemetery, Belgium

Parr's body was later found to have been buried, probably by the Germans, in a battlefield grave, which was subsequently located by the Imperial War Graves Commission. Today his grave lies in St Symphorien Military Cemetery, just southeast of Mons. The age initially given on the gravestone was 20, the British Government at the time of its manufacture not knowing that his true age was 17 due to his under-aged enlistment. By coincidence, his grave faces that of George Edwin Ellison, the last British soldier thought to have been killed during World War I, due to the close proximity in which the two men were killed.

== Memorials ==
On the 100th anniversary of Parr's death a memorial paving stone was laid in the pavement outside his home at 52 Lodge Lane. The unveiling ceremony was attended by about 300 people, including local dignitaries and Parr family members, one of whom read a letter from his mother to the War Office written in October 1914 enquiring about his fate. A memorial "standing stone" nearby, to bear a plaque with further details of Parr's life and death, is planned. A plaque has also been placed in the golf club where he worked as a caddie.

== Earlier British First World War casualties ==
While Parr is believed to be the first British Army soldier to have been killed in action, he was not the first such British Armed Forces casualty during the war, as on 6 August 1914 the British cruiser HMS Amphion (1911) hit a German mine and sank, killing about 150 sailors of the Royal Navy. Nor was he the first British soldier to lose his life in the conflict, as several had been killed by friendly fire and accidental shootings after the declaration of war but before troops were sent overseas, beginning with Cpl. Arthur Rawson on 9 August 1914.

== See also ==
- Henry Hadley, an English civilian, sometimes said to be the "first British casualty" of the war, died on 5 August 1914 after being shot by a German soldier two days earlier.
- George Masterman Thompson, the first British officer killed in the war, on 22 August 1914 in Togo

=== First soldiers killed in World War I ===
- Albert Mayer, the first soldier and first Imperial German Army soldier killed, August 2, 1914
- Jules-André Peugeot, the first French Army soldier killed, August 2, 1914
- Antoine Fonck, the first Belgian Army soldier killed, August 4, 1914
- Thomas Enright, one of the first three American Army soldiers killed, November 3, 1917
- Merle Hay, one of the first three American Army soldiers killed, November 3, 1917
- James Bethel Gresham, one of the first three American Army soldiers killed, November 3, 1917

=== Last soldiers killed in World War I ===
- George Edwin Ellison, the last British Army soldier killed, at 9:30 a.m. November 11, 1918
- Augustin Trébuchon, the last French Army soldier killed, at 10:45 a.m. November 11, 1918
- Marcel Toussaint Terfve, the last Belgian Army soldier killed, at 10:45 a.m. November 11, 1918
- George Lawrence Price, the last Canadian Army soldier killed, at 10:58 a.m. November 11, 1918
- Henry Gunther, the last soldier and last American Army soldier killed, at 10:59 a.m. November 11, 1918
