= Ville-sur-Haine =

Ville-sur-Haine Vile-so-Inne (Walloon)
- Village
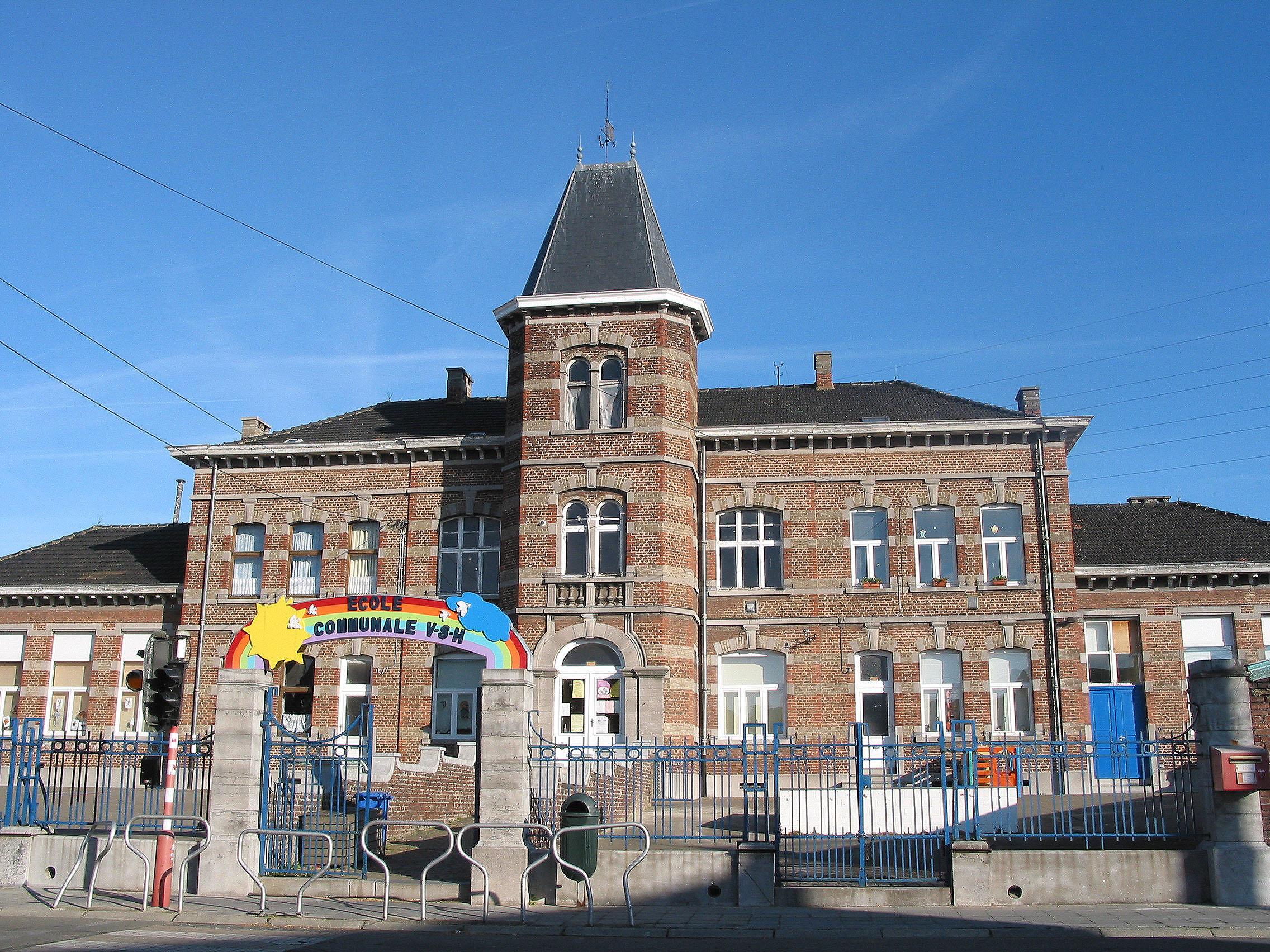
- The local school renamed École George Price
- Interactive map of Ville-sur-Haine
- Coordinates: 50.475°N 4.069°E
- Country: Belgium
- Region: Wallonia
- Province: Hainaut
- Municipality: Le Rœulx

Ville-sur-Haine (French pronunciation: [vil syʁ ɛn]; Walloon: Vile-so-Inne) is a village of Wallonia and a district of the municipality of Le Rœulx, located in the province of Hainaut, Belgium.

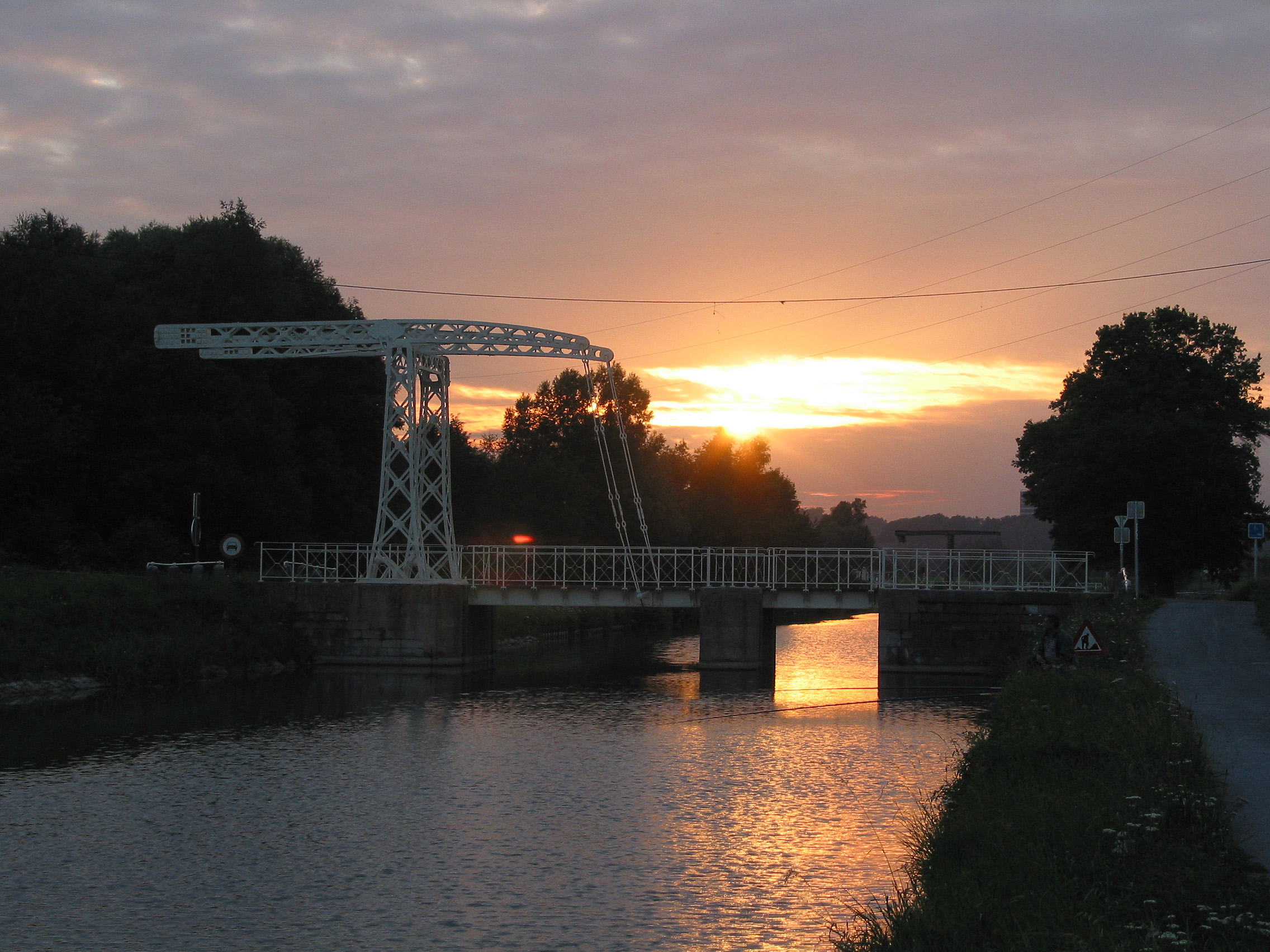
Ville-sur-Haine, old bascule bridge on the old Central Canal.

== George Lawrence Price ==
Canadian private George Lawrence Price, known as the last soldier of the British Empire to be killed in the First World War, was shot and killed by a German sniper at Ville-sur-Haine just two minutes before the armistice went into effect. A memorial plaque marks the location.

In 1991, the town erected a new footbridge across the Canal du Centre, at 50.4737°N 4.0662°E. A plebiscite was held and on 11 November of that year the bridge was officially named the George Price Footbridge (French: Passerelle George Price).

On April 24, 2015, l’école communale de Ville-sur-Haine was renamed École George Price.

On November 10, 2018, Canadian Governor General Julie Payette and other dignitaries, attended the inauguration of a tear drop shaped monument in honour of Private Price, located in Ville-sur-Haine.
