= Bathelémont =

- Commune
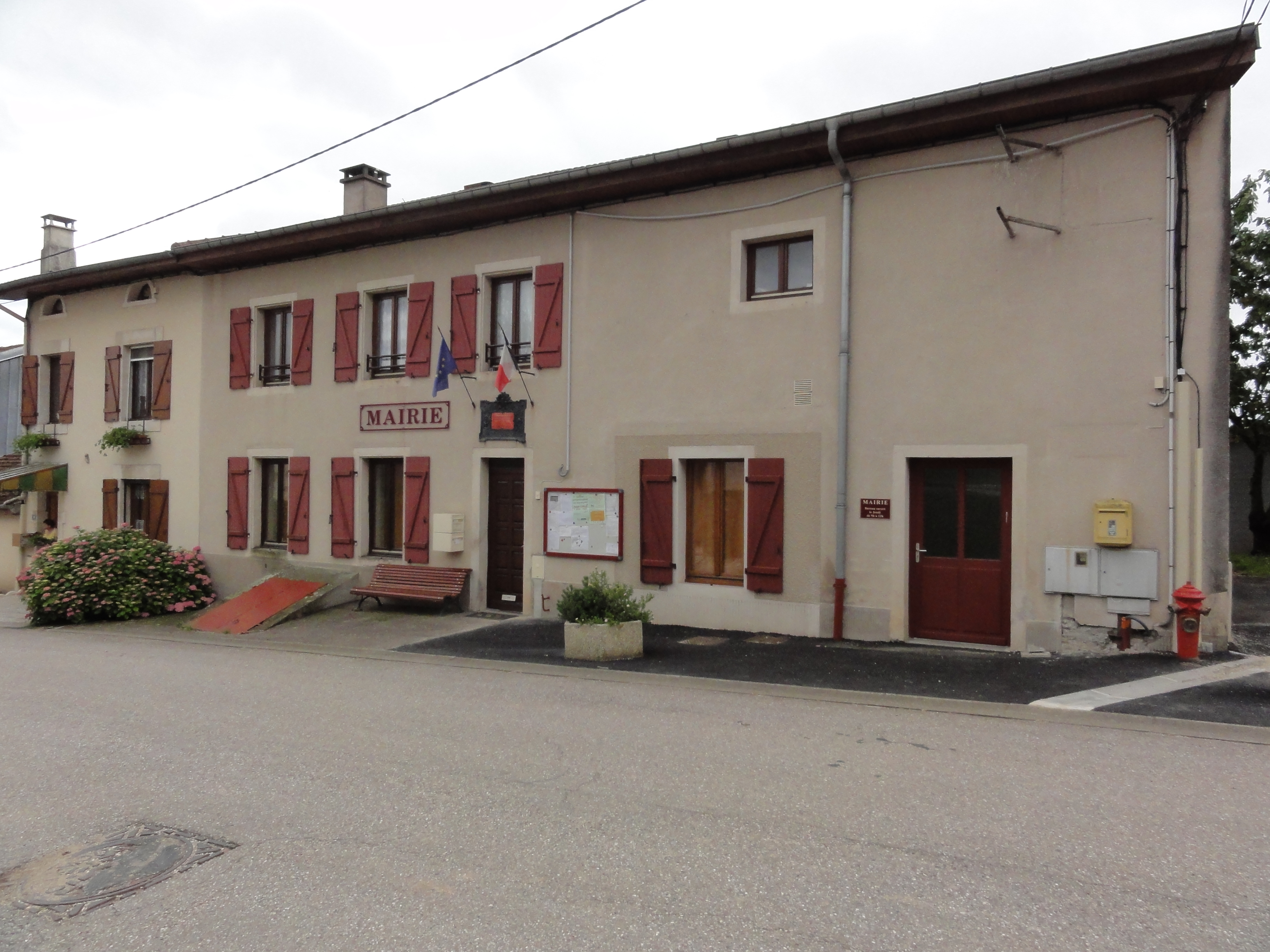
- The town hall in Bathelémont

- Coat of arms
- Location of Bathelémont
- Location within France Location within Grand Est
- Coordinates: 48°41′32″N 6°31′33″E
- Country: France
- Region: Grand Est
- Department: Meurthe-et-Moselle
- Arrondissement: Lunéville
- Canton: Baccarat
- Intercommunality: Pays du Sânon

Government
  - Mayor (2020–2026): Francis Vivier
- Area^{1}: 6.6 km^{2} (2.5 sq mi)
- Elevation: 243 m (797 ft)
- Highest elevation: 335 m (1,099 ft)
- Lowest elevation: 227 m (745 ft)
- Population (2023): 69
  - Density: 10/km^{2} (27/sq mi)
- Time zone: UTC+01:00 (CET)
  - Summer (DST): UTC+02:00 (CEST)
- INSEE/Postal code: 54050 /54370
- ^{1} French Land Register data, which excludes lakes, ponds, glaciers > 1 km^{2} (0.386 sq mi or 247 acres) and river estuaries.

Bathelémont (before 2011: Bathelémont-lès-Bauzemont) is a commune in the Meurthe-et-Moselle department in northeastern France.

== Population ==
Historical population
Year	Pop.	±% p.a.
1968	79	—
1975	71	−1.51%
1982	66	−1.04%
1990	71	+0.92%
1999	65	−0.98%
2007	58	−1.41%
2012	60	+0.68%
2017	64	+1.30%
2023	69	+1.26%
Source: INSEE

== Sights ==
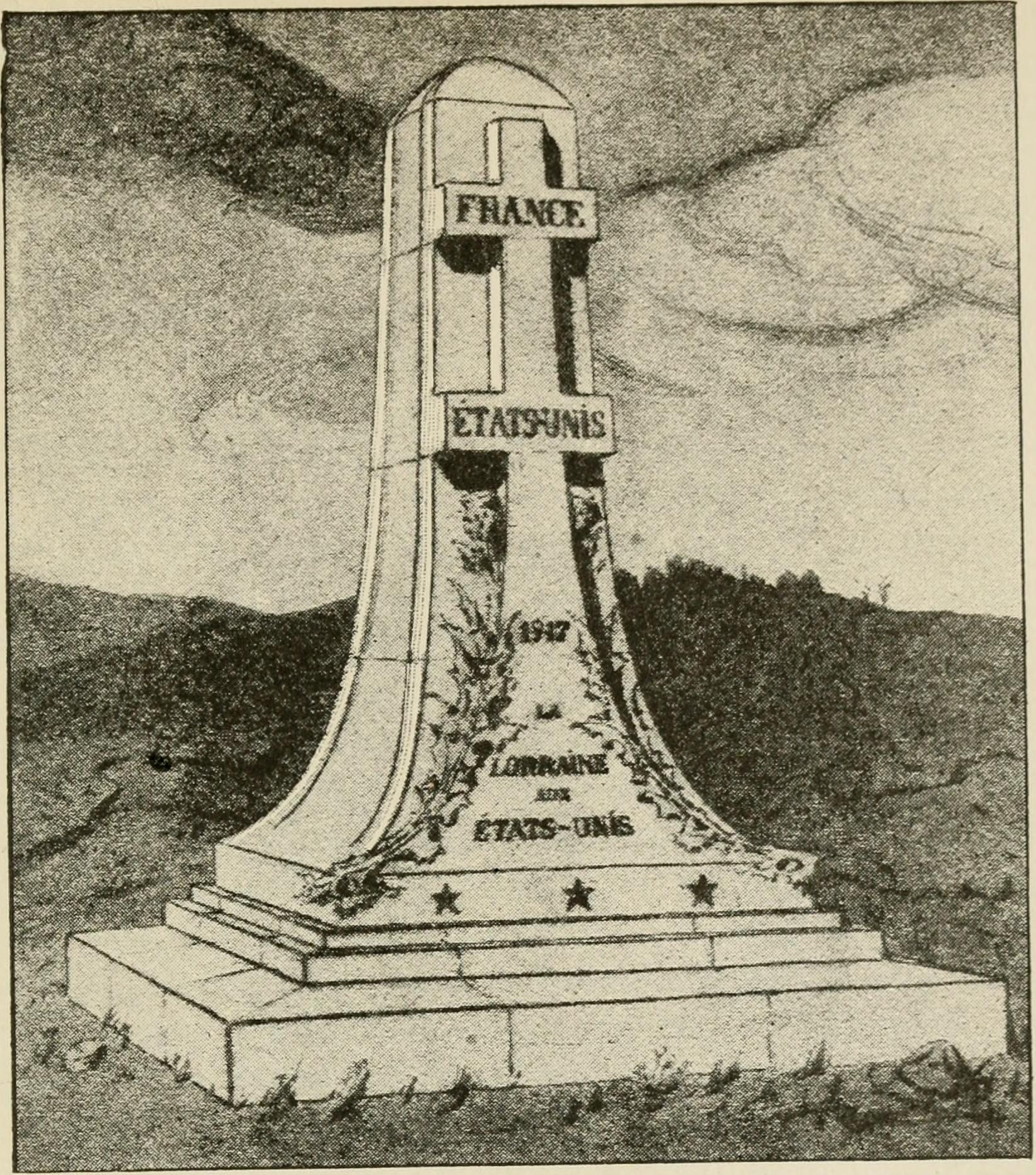
Monument to James B. Gresham, Merle D. Hay and Thomas F. Enright, designed by Louis Majorelle, erected in November 1918 in Bathelémont, destroyed by the Germans in October 1940

Near Bathelémont is a memorial to the first three U.S. soldiers killed in action in France in World War I. The three men, James Gresham, Thomas Enright, and Merle Hay, of the 16th Infantry, 1st Division, fell on November 3, 1917.

== See also ==
- Communes of the Meurthe-et-Moselle department
