= Montcabrier, Lot =

Montcabrier
- Commune
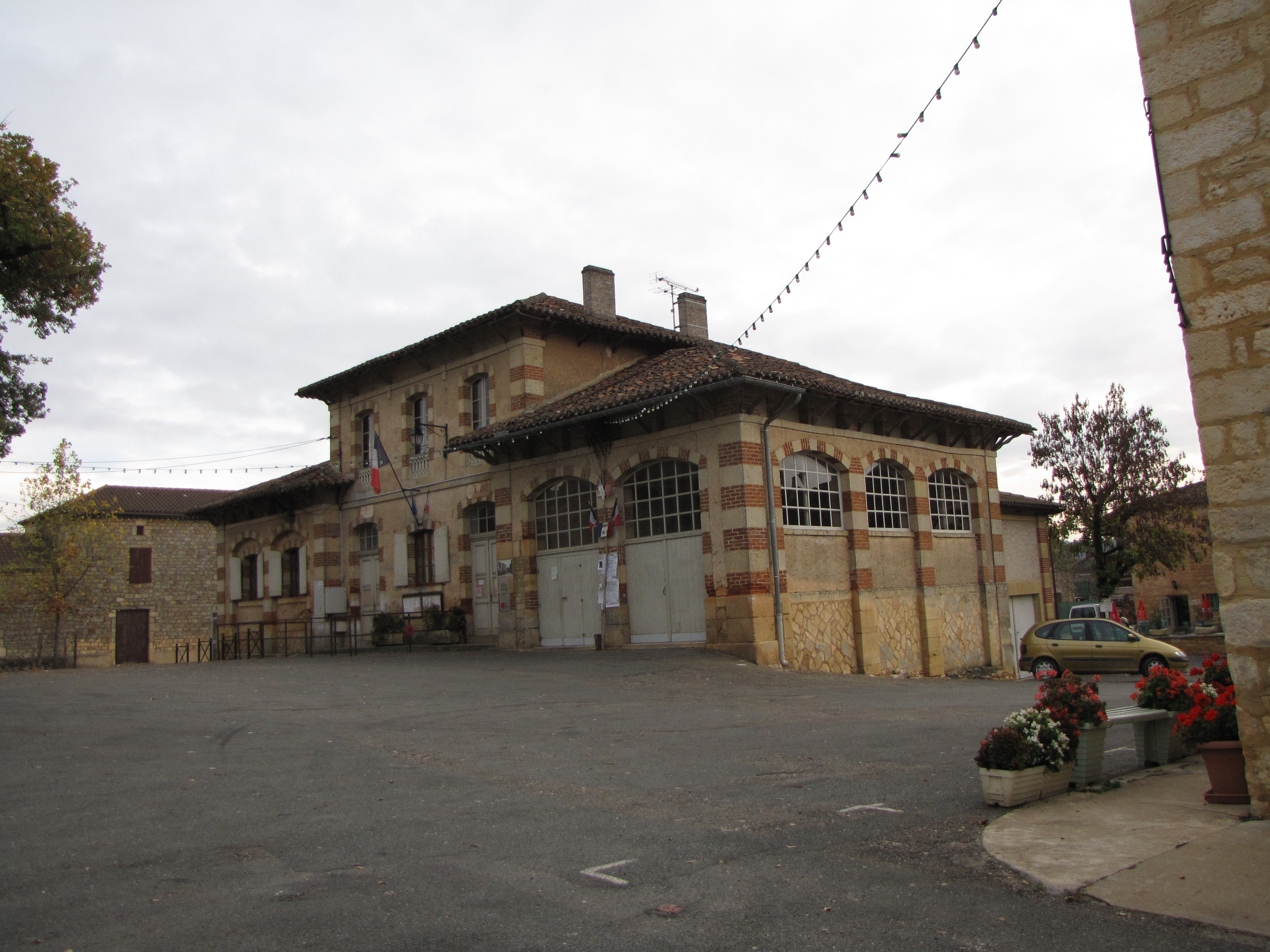
- The town hall in Montcabrier

- Coat of arms
- Location of Montcabrier
- Location within France Location within Occitanie
- Coordinates: 44°32′33″N 1°04′30″E
- Country: France
- Region: Occitania
- Department: Lot
- Arrondissement: Cahors
- Canton: Puy-l'Évêque
- Intercommunality: Vallée du Lot et du Vignoble

Government
  - Mayor (2020–2026): Didier Doriac
- Area^{1}: 21.75 km^{2} (8.40 sq mi)
- Elevation: 191 m (627 ft)
- Highest elevation: 271 m (889 ft)
- Lowest elevation: 103 m (338 ft)
- Population (2023): 342
  - Density: 15.7/km^{2} (40.7/sq mi)
- Time zone: UTC+01:00 (CET)
  - Summer (DST): UTC+02:00 (CEST)
- INSEE/Postal code: 46199 /46700
- ^{1} French Land Register data, which excludes lakes, ponds, glaciers > 1 km^{2} (0.386 sq mi or 247 acres) and river estuaries.

Montcabrier (French pronunciation: [mɔ̃kabʁije]; Languedocien: Montcabrièr) is a commune in the Lot department in south-western France.

== See also ==
- Communes of the Lot department
