= Kluizen =

- Village
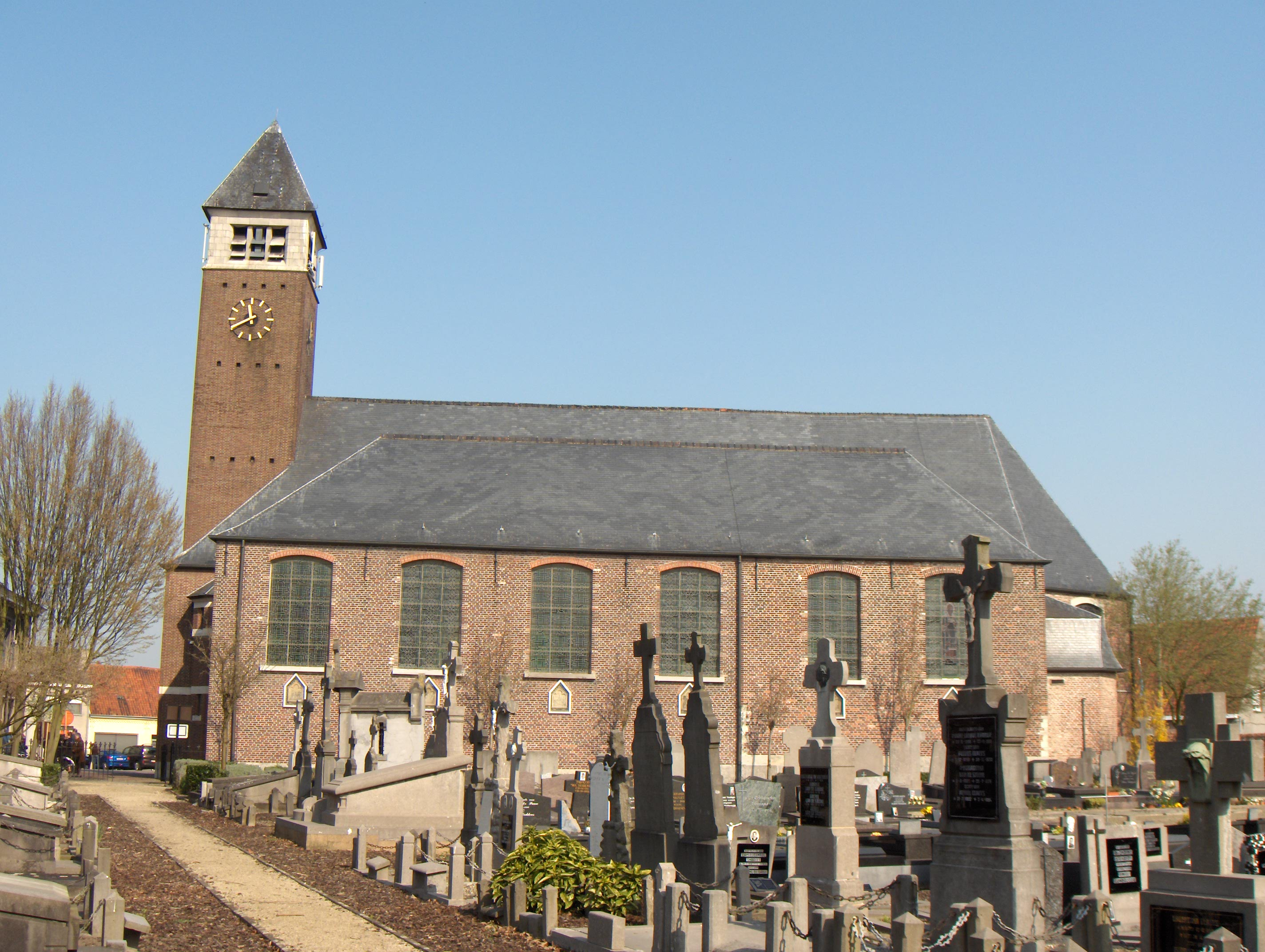
- Our Lady of the Nativity Church

- Location in Belgium
- Coordinates: 51.1542°N 3.7298°E
- Country: Belgium
- Region: Flemish Region
- Province: East Flanders
- Municipality: Evergem; Ghent

Area
  - Total: 5.86 km^{2} (2.26 sq mi)

Population (2021)
  - Total: 1,570
  - Density: 268/km^{2} (694/sq mi)
- Time zone: CET

Kluizen is a village in the municipalities of Evergem and Ghent in the province of East Flanders, Belgium. Large parts of the original municipality have become part of the Port of Ghent.

== History ==
The area around Kluizen used to be a wilderness of heath and sand grounds. Between 1115 and 1119, the land was donated to the Ename Abbey by Baldwin VII, Count of Flanders for cultivation and the construction of church. Kluizen became a parish before 1179. The village was first mentioned in 1270, and means hermitages. The area was cultivated by the late 13th century. Kluizen frequently suffered from war and was nearly depopulated during the Eighty Year's War (1568–1648). World War I and II also caused severe damage to the village. There are still 18 bunkers which were built by the German army between 1916 and 1917.

Kluizen used to be an independent municipality. Large parts of the municipality including the castle were annexed by Ghent for the construction of the Port of Ghent in 1927. Another annexation by Ghent followed in 1964, and the remainder was merged into Ertvelde, because it was considered too small to be independent. In 1977, the Ertvelde part became part of the municipality of Evergem.

In 1974, a water reservoir was constructed near Kluizen to provide drinking water for the regions Meetjesland and Waasland. In 1996, the capacity was increased with a second reservoir. In 2007, it produced 77% of the drinking water in East-Flanders.

== Buildings ==
The Our Lady of the Nativity Church is a three aisled hall church in neoclassic built between 1770 and 1772 as a replacement of the medieval church which was damaged around 1580 by the Calvinists. The church was enlarged between 1844 and 1845. On 22 May 1940, the tower was blown up and rebuilt between 1953 and 1956.
