= George Lawrence Price =

Last British Empire soldier killed in WWI

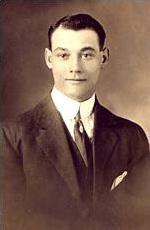
- Price, c. 1914-18
- Born: December 15, 1892; Falmouth, Nova Scotia, Canada
- Died: November 11, 1918 (aged 25); Ville-sur-Haine, Belgium
- Burial place: St Symphorien Military Cemetery, Mons, Belgium; 50°25′56″N 4°0′38″E
- Military career
- Allegiance: Canada/British Empire
- Branch: Canadian Corps (Army)
- Service years: 1917–1918
- Rank: Private
- Unit: 28th 'Northwest' Battalion Canadian Infantry (Saskatchewan Regiment) aka. 'the Nor'westers'
- Conflicts: Amiens, Cambrai, the 'Pursuit to Mons'

Private George Lawrence Price (December 15, 1892 – November 11, 1918) was a Canadian soldier. He is traditionally recognized as the last soldier of the British Empire to be killed during the First World War.

== Early life ==
Price was born in Falmouth, Nova Scotia, on December 15, 1892, and raised on Church Street, in what is now Port Williams, Nova Scotia. George was the third child of James Ephraim and Annie Rose (Stephens) Price. He moved to Moose Jaw, Saskatchewan, as a young man, where he was conscripted on October 15, 1917. He served with "A" Company of the 28th Battalion (Northwest), CEF, Canadian Expeditionary Force. Before his deployment to the war, he spent a month in prison with hard labour, because he had stolen from his landlady.

== November 11, 1918 ==
The 2nd Division's 6th Canadian Infantry Brigade was selected to attack this day. From the 6th Brigade, the 28th 'North-West' Battalion and the 31st Battalion/Alberta Regiment were chosen to lead the attack. The 28th Battalion had orders for November 11 to advance from Frameries (South of Mons) and continue to the village of Havre, securing all the bridges on the Canal du Centre. The battalion advanced rapidly starting at 4:00 a.m., pushing back light German resistance and they reached their position along the canal facing Ville-sur-Haine by 9:00 a.m. where the battalion received a message that all hostilities would cease at 11:00 a.m. Price and fellow soldier Art Goodmurphy were worried that the battalion's position on the open canal bank was exposed to German positions on the opposite side of the canal where they could see bricks had been knocked out from house dormers to create firing positions. According to Goodmurphy, they decided on their own initiative to take a patrol of five men across the bridge to search the houses. Reaching the houses and checking them one by one, they discovered German soldiers mounting machine guns along a brick wall overlooking the canal. The Germans opened fire on the patrol with heavy machine guns but the Canadians were protected by the brick walls of one of the houses. Aware that they had been discovered and outflanked, the Germans began to retreat. A Belgian family in one of the houses warned the Canadians to be careful as they followed the retreating Germans. George Price was fatally shot in the right breast by a German sniper as he stepped out of the house into the street. He was pulled into one of the houses and treated by a young Belgian nurse who ran across the street to help, but Price died a minute later at 10:58 a.m., November 11, 1918. His death was just two minutes before the armistice came into effect at 11 a.m.

== Memorials ==
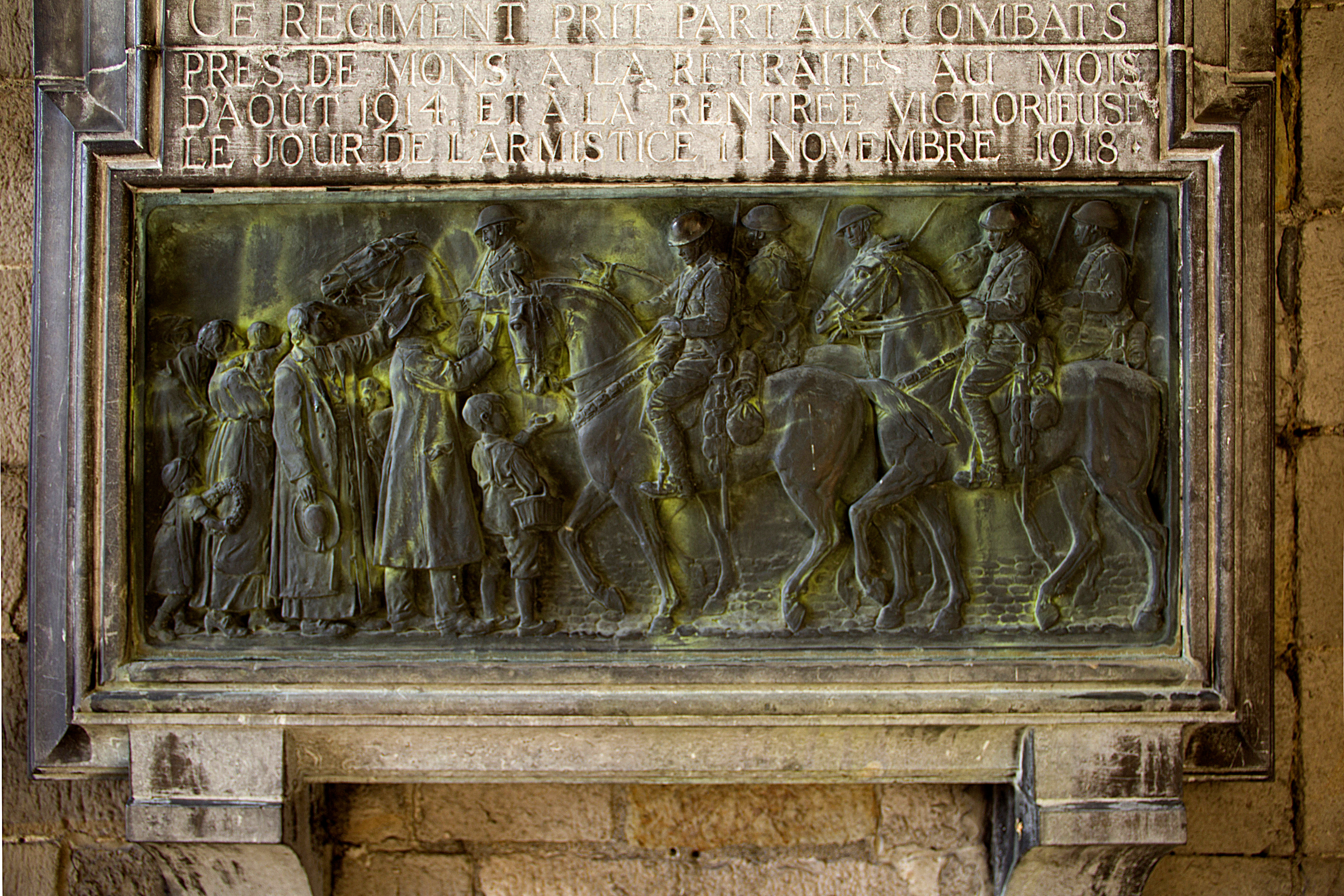
Memorial dedicated to the regiment of the British Expeditionary Force which took part in actions near Mons (Belgium).

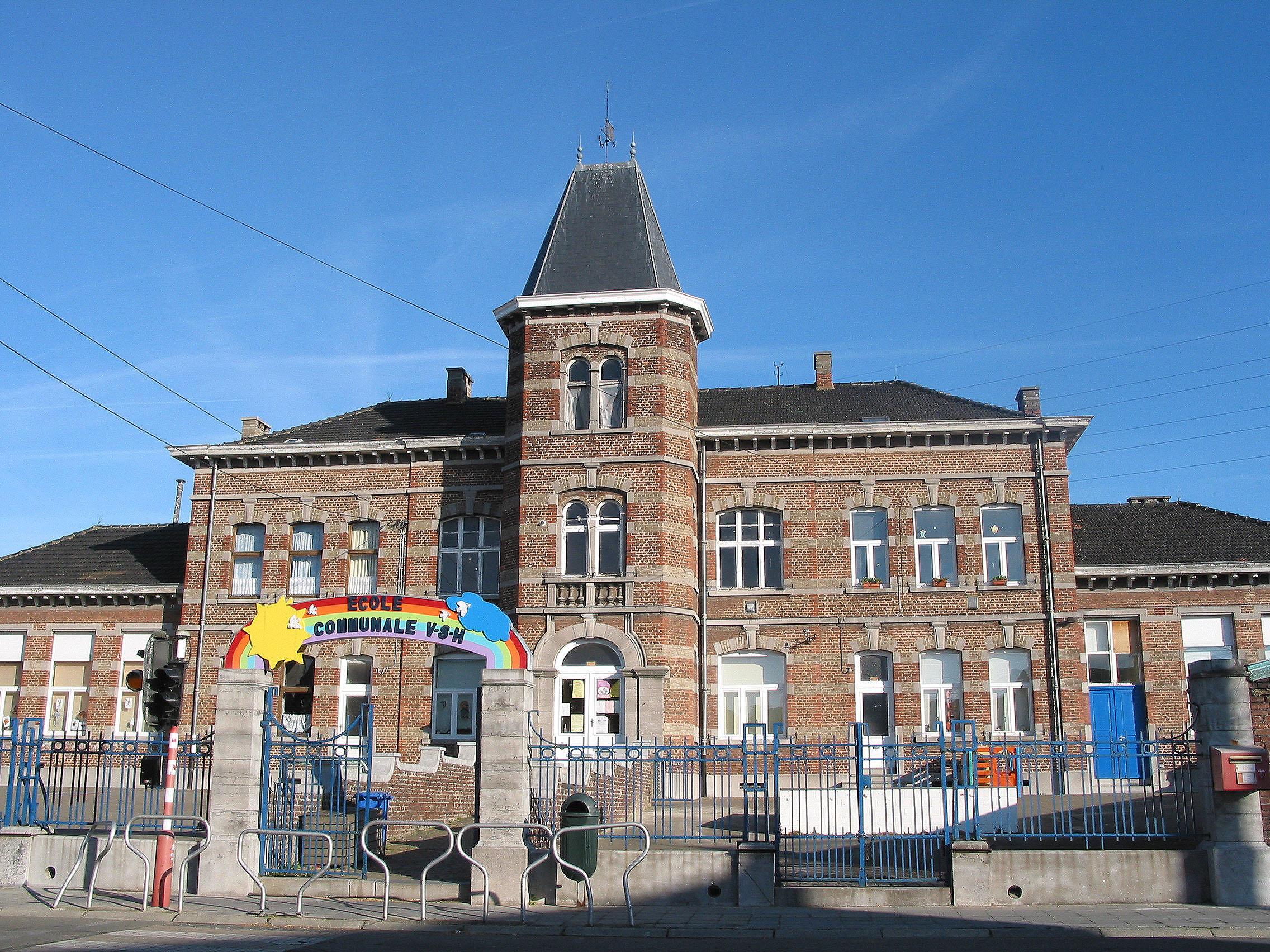
École George Price

Price was originally buried in Havre Old Communal Cemetery, one of the cemeteries subsequently concentrated into the St Symphorien military cemetery, just southeast of Mons. Coincidentally, this is also the final resting place of John Parr and George Edwin Ellison, respectively the first and last British soldiers killed during the Great War. According to Veterans Affairs Canada, Price's remains were reinterred at St Symphorien Military Cemetery after the war.

In 1968, on the 50th anniversary of his death and the armistice surviving members of his company traveled to Ville-sur-Haine and a memorial plaque was placed onto a wall of a house near the location of his death. The inscription, in English and then in French, reads in English:

To the memory of 256265 Private George Lawrence Price, 28th North West Battalion, 6th Canadian Infantry Brigade, 2nd Canadian Division, killed in action near this spot at 10.58 hours, November 11th, 1918, the last Canadian soldier to die on the Western Front in the First World War. Erected by his comrades, November 11th, 1968.

The house has since been torn down, but the plaque has been placed on a brick and stone monument near the site where the house originally stood, and thus still near the place where he fell.

In 1991, the town of Ville-sur-Haine erected a new footbridge across the adjacent Canal du Centre, at 50.4737°N 4.0662°E. A plebiscite was held and on 11 November of that year the bridge was officially named the George Price Footbridge (French: Passerelle George Price).

On April 24, 2015, the local school in Ville-sur-Haine was renamed École George Price.

In 2016, Price's medal set and the memorial plaque were donated to the Canadian War Museum.

On November 10, 2018, Canadian Governor General Julie Payette and other dignitaries attended the inauguration of a teardrop shaped monument in honour of Price, located in Ville-sur-Haine.

In Moose Jaw, Saskatchewan, on August 26, 2021, a plaque was unveiled in Crescent Park commemorating "The Last Commonwealth Soldier Killed In First World War".

== See also ==
- Augustin Trébuchon, the last French soldier killed in World War I, 10:45 a.m. November 11, 1918
- George Edwin Ellison, the last British soldier killed in World War I, 9:30 a.m. November 11, 1918
- Henry Gunther, the last American soldier killed in World War I, 10:59 a.m. November 11, 1918
- Marcel Toussaint Terfve, the last Belgian soldier killed in World War I, at 10:45 a.m. November 11, 1918
- YouTube: END OF WAR - the final minutes of WWI. The last minutes of the soldiers Augustin Trébuchon, George Lawrence Price und Henry Nicholas Gunther
