= George Edwin Ellison =

British Army soldier (1878–1918)

- Born: George Edwin Ellison; 10 August 1878; York, England
- Died: 11 November 1918 (aged 40); Mons, Belgium
- Military career
- Allegiance: United Kingdom
- Branch: British Army
- Service years: 1902–1914; 1914–1918
- Rank: Private
- Service number: L/12643
- Unit: 5th Royal Irish Lancers
- Known for: The last British soldier to die in World War I
- Conflicts: First World War: Battle of Mons; First Battle of Ypres; Battle of Armentières; Battle of La Bassée; Battle of Loos; Battle of Cambrai; Second Battle of Mons †

Private George Edwin Ellison (10 August 1878 – 11 November 1918) was the last British soldier to be killed in action during the First World War. He died at 09:30 am (90 minutes before the armistice came into effect), shot by a sniper while on a patrol in woodland on the outskirts of Mons, Belgium.

== Biography ==
Ellison was born in York and later lived in Leeds, England. He enlisted in the British Army as a regular soldier in 1902. He saw three years of service with the colours, and was transferred to the reserves for the next nine years. In 1911 he was a coal miner living in Leeds, and in 1912 he married Hannah Maria Burgan in Nottingham. Their son, James Cornelius, was born on 16 November 1913.

As a reservist, he was recalled to the army. He disembarked in France on 26 August 1914 with the 5th Royal Irish Lancers. His biography states that he fought in the Battle of Mons in 1914, and several other battles including the First Battle of Ypres, Battle of Armentières, Battle of La Bassée during 1914, Battle of Loos near Lens, Pas-de-Calais (allegedly), and Battle of Cambrai on the Western Front.

Ellison, aged 40 at the time of his death, is buried in the St Symphorien Military Cemetery, just southeast of Mons. Coincidentally, and in large part due to Mons being lost in the very opening stages of the war and regained at the very end (from the British perspective), his grave faces that of John Parr, the first British soldier killed during the Great War, and just a few metres away from George Lawrence Price, the Canadian soldier who was also felled near Mons at 10:58am, and was the last British Empire soldier killed in the Great War.

He was survived by Hannah and a son, James Cornelius (just five days short of his fifth birthday when his father was killed) – living in Richmond Hill in east Leeds, as were Ellison's parents. The family only learnt of his death just before Christmas, more than a month after the war had ended. Ellison's only brother Frederick was also killed during the war, in 1917.

== Legacy ==
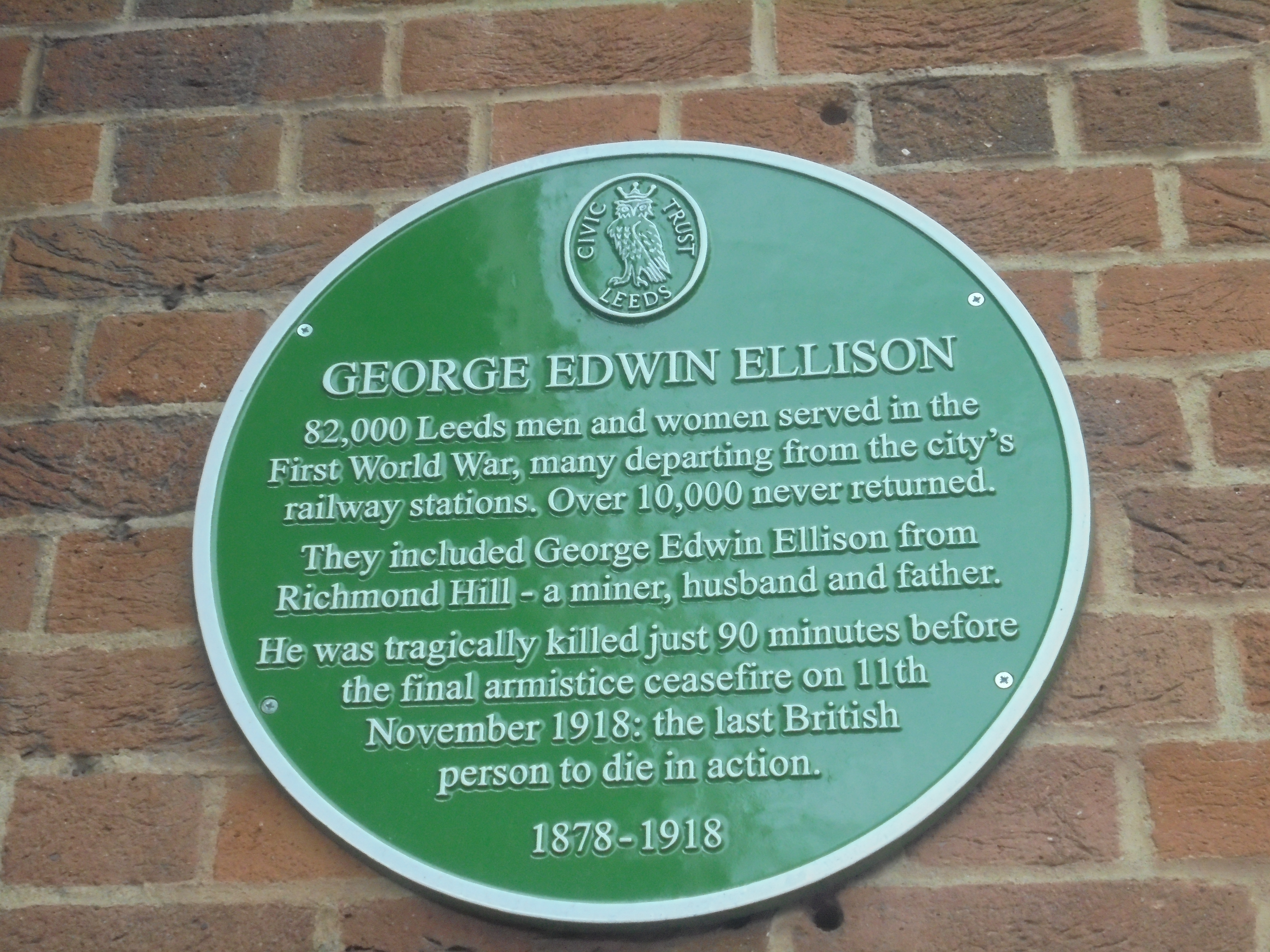
George Edward Ellison plaque outside Leeds City Station

In recent times, Ellison's story was featured in a 2008 BBC Timewatch documentary with Michael Palin, in conjunction with his granddaughters.

In 2018, he and John Parr became the inspiration behind a poem, "Goodnight Kiss", by writer Philip Parker – written as part of a project in conjunction with the Imperial War Museum.

In November 2018 (the centenary of his death), Leeds Civic Trust and partners unveiled a memorial plaque to him at Leeds railway station, paid for via a public crowdfunding campaign. The Civic Trust's plaques are usually blue, but Ellison's is olive green to symbolise the uniform of the soldiers. The unveiling event was attended by his two granddaughters and other family members. A memorial mock newspaper was created and circulated at the event, marking Ellison's life and the story of the war as experienced by regular people in Leeds.

Following the unveiling of the plaque, Leeds artist Suman Kaur heard Ellison's story, and created and circulated a 'remastered' charcoal portrait of him based on the only known photo of him.

== See also ==
- Armistice of 11 November 1918 § Last casualties
