= List of Guggenheim Fellowships awarded in 1965 =

Three hundred and thirteen scholars and artists were awarded Guggenheim Fellowships in 1965. More than $2,115,700 was disbursed.

== US and Canada Fellows ==
Category	Field of Study	Fellow	Institutional association	Research topic	Notes	Ref
Creative Arts	Choreography	Katherine Litz				
Creative Arts	Drama and Performance Art	LeRoi Jones	Black Arts Repertory/Theater School			
Creative Arts	Drama and Performance Art	Albert Bermel				
Creative Arts	Drama and Performance Art	Kenneth H. Brown				
Creative Arts	Drama and Performance Art	Arnold Weinstein	Hollins College (visiting)	Creative writing for theater		
Creative Arts	Fiction	Seymour Epstein		Writing		
Creative Arts	Fiction	Julius Horwitz		Writing	Also won in 1954	
Creative Arts	Fiction	Richard E. Kim	University of Massachusetts	Writing		
Creative Arts	Fiction	Alison Lurie		Writing		
Creative Arts	Fiction	Wallace Markfield		Writing		
Creative Arts	Fiction	Lore Segal		Writing		
Creative Arts	Film	Marie-Claire Blais			Also won in 1963	
Creative Arts	Film	Albert Maysles	Maysles Films			
Creative Arts	Fine Arts	John S. Anderson		Sculpture	Also won in 1966	
Creative Arts	Fine Arts	William Bailey	Indiana University	Painting		
Creative Arts	Fine Arts	Tosun Bayrak	Fairleigh Dickinson University	Painting		
Creative Arts	Fine Arts	Kenneth Campbell	Queens College	Sculpture		
Creative Arts	Fine Arts	Warrington Colescott	University of Wisconsin	Printmaking		
Creative Arts	Fine Arts	Herbert Fink	Southern Illinois University	Painting		
Creative Arts	Fine Arts	Juan Manuel Gómez-Quiroz				
Creative Arts	Fine Arts	William R. Geis		Sculpture		
Creative Arts	Fine Arts	Nancy Grossman		Painting		
Creative Arts	Fine Arts	Peter Hooven	Maryland Institute College of Art	Painting and printmaking		
Creative Arts	Fine Arts	Will Horwitt		Sculpture		
Creative Arts	Fine Arts	Daniel LaRue Johnson	Los Angeles General Hospital	Painting		
Creative Arts	Fine Arts	Lyman E. Kipp	Hunter College	Sculpture		
Creative Arts	Fine Arts	Joseph Konzal	Adelphi University	Sculpture		
Creative Arts	Fine Arts	George Earl Ortman	New York University	Painting		
Creative Arts	Fine Arts	Peter Paone	Pratt Institute	Printmaking		
Creative Arts	Fine Arts	David Gordon Pease	Temple University	Painting		
Creative Arts	Fine Arts	Thomas Robert Stearns		Sculpture		
Creative Arts	Music Composition	George Barati	Honolulu Symphony	Composing		
Creative Arts	Music Composition	Earle Brown	Time-Mainstream Records	Composing		
Creative Arts	Music Composition	Paul Cooper	University of Michigan	Composing	Also won in 1972	
Creative Arts	Music Composition	John C. Eaton	East Stroudsburg State College	Composing	Also won in 1962	
Creative Arts	Music Composition	Donald James Erb	Bowling Green State University	Composing		
Creative Arts	Music Composition	Gail T. Kubik		Composing	Also won in 1944	
Creative Arts	Music Composition	William R. Mayer		Composing		
Creative Arts	Music Composition	Robert Earl Middleton	Vassar College	Composing		
Creative Arts	Music Composition	Stanley Joel Silverman	Buffalo State University (visiting)	Composing	Also won in 1976	
Creative Arts	Photography	Scott Hyde				
Creative Arts	Photography	Lisette Model				
Creative Arts	Poetry	Hayden Carruth		Writing	Also won in 1979	
Creative Arts	Poetry	Allen Ginsberg		Writing		
Creative Arts	Poetry	John Haines		Writing	Also won in 1984	
Creative Arts	Poetry	David Ignatow		Writing	Also won in 1973	
Humanities	African Studies	James Edward Duffy	Brandeis University			
Humanities	American Literature	Louis John Budd	Duke University	Reception of French fiction in the United States between 1850 and 1900		
Humanities	American Literature	Edward Hutchins Davidson	University of Illinois at Urbana-Champaign			
Humanities	American Literature	Leon Edel	New York University		Also won in 1936, 1938	
Humanities	American Literature	Leo Marx	Amherst College	Literary pastoralism in modern American writing	Also won in 1961	
Humanities	American Literature	Earl H. Rovit	Wesleyan University (visiting)	Emerson's prose style		
Humanities	Architecture, Design and Planning	James Arthur Gresham	University of Arizona	Circulation spaces (stairways) as they are used in medieval and modern buildings		
Humanities	Architecture, Design and Planning	Frederick Gutheim	Washington Center for Metropolitan Studies			
Humanities	Architecture, Design and Planning	Seymour J. Mandelbaum	Carnegie Institute of Technology	Impact of changes in communication and information systems upon urban development		
Humanities	Architecture, Design and Planning	Terence George Swales				
Humanities	Bibliography	William B. Todd	University of Texas	Mark Twain's works		
Humanities	Bibliography	Richard Gwen Underwood	Syracuse University Press	Methods of financing and publishing scholarly research in Europe, where there are no university presses		
Humanities	Biography	Carlos Baker	Princeton University	Ernest Hemingway		
Humanities	Biography	Allan Seager	University of Michigan	Theodore Roethke		
Humanities	British History	Dudley W. R. Bahlman	Williams College	Relations of church and state in 19th-century England		
Humanities	British History	James F. Larkin	DePaul University			
Humanities	British History	Stanford Lehmberg	University of Texas	English Reformation Parliament	Also won in 1985	
Humanities	British History	Albert J. Loomie	Fordham University	Anglo-Spanish diplomacy, 1605-1630		
Humanities	British History	Donald B. Meyer	University of California, Los Angeles			
Humanities	Classics	Thomas Fauss Gould	University of Texas	Quarrell between poetry and philosophy as reflected in the works of Plato and Aristotle		
Humanities	Classics	Michael Hamilton Jameson	University of Pennsylvania			
Humanities	Classics	George Leonidas Koniaris	University of California, Berkeley	Edition of Maximus of Tyre		
Humanities	Classics	Zeph Stewart	Harvard University			
Humanities	East Asian Studies	Hans Hermann Frankel	Yale University	Chinese poetry in the context of world literature		
Humanities	East Asian Studies	Herschel Webb	Columbia University			
Humanities	Economic History	Philip De Armind Curtin	University of Wisconsin	18th-century economic history in Senegal, French West Africa	Also won in 1979	
Humanities	Economic History	Jacob Myron Price	University of Michigan		Also won in 1958	
Humanities	Economic History	Andrew Murray Watson	University of Toronto			
Humanities	Economic History	Vernon Kenneth Zimmerman	University of Illinois at Urbana-Champaign			
Humanities	English Literature	Walter Jackson Bate	Harvard University		Also won in 1956	
Humanities	English Literature	Reuben Arthur Brower	Harvard University		Also won in 1956	
Humanities	English Literature	James Lowry Clifford	Columbia University		Also won in 1951	
Humanities	English Literature	Morton Norton Cohen	City College of New York			
Humanities	English Literature	William Evan Fredeman	University of British Columbia	Edition of original documents of the pre-Raphaelite movement	Also won in 1971	
Humanities	English Literature	Alfred Harbage	Harvard University		Also won in 1953	
Humanities	English Literature	Carolyn Heilbrun	Columbia University			
Humanities	English Literature	Virgil Barney Heltzel	Northwestern University		Also won in 1949, 1950	
Humanities	English Literature	Walter Edwards Houghton	Wellesley College			
Humanities	English Literature	Wendell Stacy Johnson	Hunter College			
Humanities	English Literature	Frederick Robert Karl	City College of New York			
Humanities	English Literature	J. Hillis Miller	Johns Hopkins University	Victorian novel	Also won in 1959	
Humanities	English Literature	Daniel Joseph Murphy	City College of New York			
Humanities	English Literature	James Graham Nelson	University of Wisconsin	Early history of Bodley Head		
Humanities	English Literature	Maximillian E. Novak	University of California, Los Angeles		Also won in 1985	
Humanities	English Literature	Lona Mosk Packer	University of Utah			
Humanities	English Literature	Ronald Howard Paulson	Rice University		Also won in 1986	
Humanities	English Literature	Mark L. Reed	University of North Carolina	Detailed chronology of William Wordsworth's life and works	Also won in 1970	
Humanities	English Literature	Ann Saddlemyer	University of Victoria	Esthetic theories of John Millington Synge and William Butler Yeats	Also won in 1977	
Humanities	English Literature	Joan Webber	Ohio State University			
Humanities	English Literature	Calhoun Winton	University of Delaware	Second volume of a biography of Richard Steele		
Humanities	Fine Arts Research	Egbert Haverkamp-Begemann	Yale University	Georg Hoefnagel		
Humanities	Fine Arts Research	Howard Hibbard	Columbia University	Carlo Maderno	Also won in 1972	
Humanities	Fine Arts Research	Parker Tyler				
Humanities	Fine Arts Research	Nelson Ikon Wu	Yale University	Chinese pictorial design of the Ming Dynasty		
Humanities	Folklore and Popular Culture	Roger D. Abrahams	University of Texas	Christmas folk-plays in the British West Indies		
Humanities	Folklore and Popular Culture	Edward D. Ives	University of Maine	Joe Scott and the Anglo-American ballad tradition		
Humanities	French Literature	James Doolittle	University of Cincinnati			
Humanities	French Literature	Serge Doubrovsky	Smith College	Contemporary French literary criticism	Also won in 1968	
Humanities	French Literature	Martin Kanes	University of California, Davis			
Humanities	General Nonfiction	Mark Harris	San Francisco State College		Also won in 1974	
Humanities	Geography and Environmental Studies	Clarence James Glacken	University of California, Berkeley	Nature protection movement and its scientific, humanistic, and esthetic implications		
Humanities	Geography and Environmental Studies	Carl Lewis Johannessen	University of Oregon			
Humanities	Geography and Environmental Studies	David Lowenthal	American Geographical Society	Ordinary, vernacular buildings and landscapes		
Humanities	German and Eastern European History	Edward W. Bennett	Central Intelligence Agency			
Humanities	German and Eastern European History	Joachim Remak	Lewis and Clark College	Origins of World War II		
Humanities	German and Eastern European History	Henry Ashby Turner	Yale University	Political attitudes and activities of the German business community in the Weimar Republic		
Humanities	German and Scandinavian Literature	Frederick John Beharriell	Indiana University			
Humanities	German and Scandinavian Literature	Eric Albert Blackall	Cornell University	Formal structure of the novels of the German Romantics		
Humanities	German and Scandinavian Literature	Peter Demetz	Yale University	19th-century theories of realism		
Humanities	German and Scandinavian Literature	Andrew Oscar Jaszi	University of California, Berkeley	Aesthetics of lyric poetry, with a consideration of the ontological status of works of art in general		
Humanities	History of Science and Technology	Allen G. Debus	University of Chicago			
Humanities	History of Science and Technology	Donald Harnish Fleming	Harvard University			
Humanities	History of Science and Technology	Edward Grant	Indiana University	Physical reality and hypothese in late medieval science		
Humanities	History of Science and Technology	Charles E. Rosenberg	University of Pennsylvania		Also won in 1989	
Humanities	Iberian and Latin American History	Peter Gerhard	Hispanic Division, Library of Congress			
Humanities	Iberian and Latin American History	Robert E. Quirk	Indiana University			
Humanities	Italian Literature	Louise George Clubb	University of California, Berkeley (visiting)	Influence of Italian drama in the 16th and 17th centuries		
Humanities	Linguistics	James Barr	Princeton Theological Seminary			
Humanities	Linguistics	Herbert L. Kufner	Cornell University	Contrasts in linguistic structure between English and German		
Humanities	Literary Criticism	Charles Roberts Anderson	Johns Hopkins University	Critical interpretation of the major novels of Henry James		
Humanities	Literary Criticism	Bernard N. Schilling	University of Rochester			
Humanities	Literary Criticism	Monroe Kirk Spears	Rice University	Poetry in English since 1910	Also won in 1972	
Humanities	Literary Criticism	James Thorpe	Princeton University		Also won in 1949	
Humanities	Medieval History	Robert James Brentano	University of California, Berkeley	History of the 13th-century diocese of Rieti, Italy	Also won in 1978	
Humanities	Medieval History	Charles Warren Hollister	University of California, Santa Barbara	Research work for a book on the reign of Henry I of England		
Humanities	Medieval Literature	Larry Dean Benson	Harvard University			
Humanities	Medieval Literature	Rowland L. Collins	Indiana University	Preparation of an edition of the Blickling homilies		
Humanities	Medieval Literature	Albert B. Friedman	Claremont Colleges		Also won in 1957	
Humanities	Medieval Literature	Stanley B. Greenfield	University of Oregon			
Humanities	Music Research	Ernest H. Sanders	Columbia University			
Humanities	Music Research	Milton Steinhardt	University of Kansas	Life and music of Alard du Gaucquier	Also won in 1958	
Humanities	Near Eastern Studies	Paul Julius Alexander	Hobart and William Smith Colleges	Byzantine history of the Middle Ages	Also won in 1951	
Humanities	Near Eastern Studies	William Michael Brinner	University of California, Berkeley	Society and culture in Mamluk Egypt		
Humanities	Near Eastern Studies	Shelomo Dov Goitein	University of Pennsylvania		Also won in 1970	
Humanities	Near Eastern Studies	William Wolfgang Hallo	Yale University	An edition of Sumerian royal hymns		
Humanities	Near Eastern Studies	Rivkah Harris	University of Chicago			
Humanities	Near Eastern Studies	William Kelly Simpson	Yale University	Editing of Reisner Papyrus II and III and a report on the Toshka West cemeteries in Nubia		
Humanities	Philosophy	Peter Achinstein	Johns Hopkins University	Distinction between theoretical and observational terms in the conduct of scientific inquiry		
Humanities	Philosophy	Raymond Klibansky	McGill University	History of Platonism	Also won in 1953	
Humanities	Philosophy	Hugues Leblanc	Bryn Mawr College			
Humanities	Philosophy	George Willard Pitcher	Princeton University			
Humanities	Philosophy	Richard Schmitt	Brown University			
Humanities	Philosophy	Calvin Orville Schrag	Purdue University	Martin Heidegger's existentialist concepts		
Humanities	Philosophy	Irving Singer	Massachusetts Institute of Technology			
Humanities	Philosophy	Colin Murray Turbayne	University of Rochester			
Humanities	Philosophy	Rudolph H. Weingartner	University of California, San Francisco			
Humanities	Philosophy	Robert M. Yost	University of California, Los Angeles			
Humanities	Religion	Robert Walter Funk	Drew University	Form and style of the Paline letter		
Humanities	Religion	Langdon Brown Gilkey	University of Chicago		Also won in 1960	
Humanities	Religion	Ralph Harper	St. James Church	Religious tradition and the school of existentialism	Also won in 1957	
Humanities	Religion	John H. P. Reumann	Lutheran Theological Seminary at Philadelphia			
Humanities	Renaissance History	John Hazel Smith	Marquette University	Renaissance texts in Seneca's tragedies		
Humanities	Russian History	Richard Austin Pierce	Queen's University			
Humanities	Russian History	Richard Edgar Pipes	Harvard University		Also won in 1956	
Humanities	Russian History	Alfred J. Rieber	Northwestern University			
Humanities	Slavic Literature	Richard A. Gregg	Columbia University			
Humanities	Slavic Literature	Hugh McLean	University of Chicago			
Humanities	Spanish and Portuguese Literature	Edith Fishtine Helman	Simmons College			
Humanities	Spanish and Portuguese Literature	Paul Ilie	University of Southern California			
Humanities	Spanish and Portuguese Literature	Willard F. King	Bryn Mawr College			
Humanities	Spanish and Portuguese Literature	Hardie St. Martin				
Humanities	Spanish and Portuguese Literature	Alan S. Trueblood	Brown University	Spanish drama of the Golden Age		
Humanities	Theatre Arts	Ralph Gilmore Allen	University of Pittsburgh	Stage spectacle in the English theater of the 18th century		
Humanities	Theatre Arts	Ruby Cohn	University of California, San Francisco			
Humanities	United States History	Robert J. C. Butow	University of Washington		Also won in 1978	
Humanities	United States History	Paul Keith Conkin	University of Maryland	Basic beliefs in America from Puritanism to pragmatism		
Humanities	United States History	John A. Garraty	Columbia University			
Humanities	United States History	Zoltán Haraszti	Boston Public Library			
Humanities	United States History	Ari Arthur Hoogenboom	Pennsylvania State University	History of bureaucracy during the administration of Abraham Lincoln and Andrew Jackson		
Humanities	United States History	Reginald Horsman	University of Wisconsin	War of 1812		
Humanities	United States History	Harold Clark Kirker	Massachusetts Institute of Technology	Cultural history of San Francisco, 1832-1932		
Humanities	United States History	Paul Lloyd Murphy	University of Minnesota	Freedom of speech in the United States, 1918 to 1933		
Humanities	United States History	Martin Ridge	Indiana University			
Humanities	United States History	Francis Russell		Biography of Warren G. Harding	Also won in 1964	
Humanities	United States History	John Lovell Thomas	Brown University	Biography of Edward Bellamy		
Natural Sciences	Applied Mathematics	Allan J. Lichtenberg	University of California, Berkeley	High temperature plasmas and phase space concepts in particle dynamics		
Natural Sciences	Applied Mathematics	Edward Lawrence Reiss	New York University	Mathematical studies of the propagation of waves through solid media		
Natural Sciences	Applied Mathematics	Shyh Wang	University of California, Berkeley	Interaction of phonon and light waves in intermetallic compounds		
Natural Sciences	Astronomy and Astrophysics	David Breed Beard	University of Kansas	Interactions of magnetic fields with ionized plasmas in the solar atmosphere and interplanetary space		
Natural Sciences	Astronomy and Astrophysics	Herman Lawrence Helfer	University of Rochester			
Natural Sciences	Astronomy and Astrophysics	John Randolph Winckler	University of Minnesota	Plasma physics of active solar regions		
Natural Sciences	Chemistry	Joseph Berkowitz	Argonne National Laboratory			
Natural Sciences	Chemistry	Seymour Michael Blinder	University of Michigan			
Natural Sciences	Chemistry	William G. Dauben	University of California, Berkeley	Spectral and optical properties of conjugated systems containing cyclopropane rings	Also won in 1950	
Natural Sciences	Chemistry	Mostafa A. El-Sayed	University of California, Los Angeles			
Natural Sciences	Chemistry	James Cullen Martin	University of Illinois at Urbana-Champaign			
Natural Sciences	Chemistry	Karol J. Mysels	University of Southern California	Cell membranes		
Natural Sciences	Chemistry	Linus Pauling	Center for the Study of Democratic Institutions	Chemistry and related sciences	Also won in 1926, 1927	
Natural Sciences	Chemistry	Myron Rosenblum	Brandeis University			
Natural Sciences	Chemistry	Riley Schaeffer	Indiana University			
Natural Sciences	Chemistry	Rangaswamy Srinivasan	IBM Research			
Natural Sciences	Chemistry	Stanley Gerald Thompson	Lawrence Berkeley National Laboratory	Nuclear fission and its interpretation by means of the liquid-drop model	Also won in 1954	
Natural Sciences	Chemistry	Ernest Wenkert	Indiana University			
Natural Sciences	Computer Science	Arthur Gill	University of California, Berkeley	Interrelation between automata theory and information theory with emphasis on the design of reliable systems		
Natural Sciences	Computer Science	Martin Greenberger	Massachusetts Institute of Technology			
Natural Sciences	Earth Science	J. Wyatt Durham	University of California, Berkeley	Relationships of the major groups of echinoderms	Also won in 1954	
Natural Sciences	Earth Science	Richard Foster Flint	Yale University	Changes of climate in the Southern Hemisphere during the Last Glacial Period		
Natural Sciences	Earth Science	Paul Schultz Martin	University of Arizona	Extinction of certain prehistoric animals		
Natural Sciences	Earth Science	Robert Scholten	Pennsylvania State University	Gravity tectonics in the Southern Alps		
Natural Sciences	Earth Science	Hans Eduard Suess	University of California, San Diego			
Natural Sciences	Earth Science	Alexis Volborth	University of Nevada	Geochemical aspects of magmatic granites in Australia, Japan, New Zealand, and Egypt		
Natural Sciences	Engineering	Raj Mittra	University of Illinois at Urbana-Champaign			
Natural Sciences	Engineering	William H. Robinson	Carnegie Institute of Technology	Mechanical properties of metal crystals		
Natural Sciences	Engineering	Chang-Lin Tien	University of California, Berkeley	Theoretical studies of heat transfer in rotating systems		
Natural Sciences	Engineering	Jerome H. Weiner	Columbia University			
Natural Sciences	Mathematics	James Burton Ax	Cornell University	Algebraic number theory		
Natural Sciences	Mathematics	Edgar H. Brown	Brandeis University	Algebraic and differential topology		
Natural Sciences	Mathematics	Robert Finn	Stanford University	Partial differential equations	Also won in 1958	
Natural Sciences	Mathematics	James Gilbert Glimm	Massachusetts Institute of Technology	Differential equations of the motion of gases	Also won in 1963	
Natural Sciences	Mathematics	Serge Lang	Columbia University	Algebraic number theory		
Natural Sciences	Mathematics	Murray Rosenblatt	University of California, San Diego	Nonlinear analysis of random processes	Also won in 1971	
Natural Sciences	Mathematics	Frank L. Spitzer	Cornell University	Theory of stochastic processes		
Natural Sciences	Medicine and Health	Walter Jackson Freeman III	University of California, Berkeley	Electrophysiology of the mammalian nervous system		
Natural Sciences	Medicine and Health	Henry N. Harkins	University of Washington		Also won in 1938, 1939	
Natural Sciences	Medicine and Health	John Marvin Marshall	University of Pennsylvania			
Natural Sciences	Medicine and Health	Raymond D. A. Peterson	University of Minnesota	Biological and biochemical study of cell differentiation		
Natural Sciences	Medicine and Health	Bernard J. Ransil	Los Angeles General Hospital			
Natural Sciences	Medicine and Health	Richard A. Rifkind	Columbia University			
Natural Sciences	Molecular and Cellular Biology	Edward A. Adelberg	Yale University	Structural gene mutation by genetic and biochemical analysis	Also won in 1956	
Natural Sciences	Molecular and Cellular Biology	Edward L. Alpen	University of California, San Francisco			
Natural Sciences	Molecular and Cellular Biology	John Magruder Clark	University of Illinois at Urbana-Champaign			
Natural Sciences	Molecular and Cellular Biology	Eugene A. Davidson	Duke University	Mechanism of biochemical stereospecificity		
Natural Sciences	Molecular and Cellular Biology	Norman H. Giles	Yale University	Genetic systems of metabolic regulation	Also won in 1959	
Natural Sciences	Molecular and Cellular Biology	John Woodland Hastings	University of Illinois at Urbana-Champaign			
Natural Sciences	Molecular and Cellular Biology	John Lyman Ingraham	University of California, Davis			
Natural Sciences	Molecular and Cellular Biology	George Kalnitsky	University of Iowa	Protein chemistry and the relationships between structure and function		
Natural Sciences	Molecular and Cellular Biology	Edward Leete	University of Minnesota	Investigation of the enzyme systems that control the biosynthesis of alkaloids and plant steroids		
Natural Sciences	Molecular and Cellular Biology	Martin Lubin	Harvard University			
Natural Sciences	Molecular and Cellular Biology	William Randolph Martin	University of Chicago			
Natural Sciences	Molecular and Cellular Biology	David C. Mauzerall	Rockefeller Institute			
Natural Sciences	Molecular and Cellular Biology	David Perlman	Squibb Institute for Medical Research			
Natural Sciences	Molecular and Cellular Biology	Aloys Louis Tappel	University of California, Davis			
Natural Sciences	Molecular and Cellular Biology	James D. Watson	Harvard University		Also won in 1983	
Natural Sciences	Molecular and Cellular Biology	Robley Cook Williams	University of California, Berkeley	Investigations of virus structure by high-resolution electron microscopy		
Natural Sciences	Organismic Biology and Ecology	Angel Chua Alcala	Stanford University		Also won in 1963	
Natural Sciences	Organismic Biology and Ecology	Robert Day Allen	Princeton University		Also won in 1960	
Natural Sciences	Organismic Biology and Ecology	Harold C. Hanson				
Natural Sciences	Organismic Biology and Ecology	Victor Hobbs Hutchison	University of Rhode Island			
Natural Sciences	Organismic Biology and Ecology	Jack C. Jones	University of Maryland	Comparative cytology and in vitro behavior of the circulatory cells of selected marine invertebrates		
Natural Sciences	Organismic Biology and Ecology	David Harold Kistner	Chico State College	Myrmecophiles		
Natural Sciences	Organismic Biology and Ecology	John Walley Littlefield	Harvard University			
Natural Sciences	Physics	Fay Ajzenberg-Selove	Haverford College			
Natural Sciences	Physics	Daniel Alpert	University of Illinois at Urbana-Champaign			
Natural Sciences	Physics	Leon N. Cooper	Brown University			
Natural Sciences	Physics	Paul Palmer Craig	Brookhaven National Laboratory	Cryogenics		
Natural Sciences	Physics	Simeon Adlow Friedberg	Carnegie Institute of Technology	Mechanisms by which electric current and heat are transported through certain kinds of alloys and magnetic crystal at low temperature		
Natural Sciences	Physics	Jack Marvin Hollander	Lawrence Berkeley National Laboratory	Experimental studies in nuclear spectroscopy	Also won in 1958	
Natural Sciences	Physics	Kerson Huang	Massachusetts Institute of Technology			
Natural Sciences	Physics	Earle Leonard Lomon	Massachusetts Institute of Technology	High energy physics		
Natural Sciences	Physics	Eugene S. Machlin	Columbia University			
Natural Sciences	Physics	Jerry B. Marion	University of Maryland	Experimental studies in the physics of nuclear structure		
Natural Sciences	Physics	Paul C. Martin	Harvard University		Also won in 1971	
Natural Sciences	Physics	Thaddeus B. Massalski	Mellon Institute	Electronic structure of alloys		
Natural Sciences	Physics	Kazuhiko Nishijima	University of Illinois at Urbana-Champaign			
Natural Sciences	Physics	Arthur Aaron Oliner	Polytechnic Institute of Brooklyn			
Natural Sciences	Physics	Frank Oppenheimer	University of Colorado			
Natural Sciences	Physics	Alan Mark Portis	University of California, Berkeley	Collective phenomena in solids at low temperature		
Natural Sciences	Physics	Melvin Schwartz	Columbia University			
Natural Sciences	Physics	James Hammond Smith	University of Illinois at Urbana-Champaign			
Natural Sciences	Physics	George Abraham Snow	University of Maryland	Experimental studies on hyperon-proton interactions and the rate of radioactive decay		
Natural Sciences	Physics	Peter C. Stein	Cornell University	Electron-positron interactions		
Natural Sciences	Physics	Alec Thompson Stewart	University of North Carolina	Electronic structure of materials by the annihilation of positrons		
Natural Sciences	Physics	Donald Harvey Stork	University of California, Los Angeles			
Natural Sciences	Physics	Kenneth Stephen Toth	Oak Ridge National Laboratory	Neutron transfer reactions with heavy ions		
Natural Sciences	Physics	San Fu Tuan	Purdue University	High energy and low temperature physics		
Natural Sciences	Physics	Nguyen-Huu Xuong	University of California, San Diego			
Natural Sciences	Plant Sciences	Ray Franklin Evert	University of Wisconsin	Ultra-structure of the food conducting tissues of trees		
Natural Sciences	Plant Sciences	Kornelius Lems	Goucher College	Evolution of plants in the Canary Islands		
Natural Sciences	Plant Sciences	Donald E. Munnecke	University of California, Riverside			
Natural Sciences	Plant Sciences	John Raymond Rowley	University of Massachusetts	Formation and growth of pollen grains and spores		
Natural Sciences	Plant Sciences	John Gordon Torrey	Harvard University			
Natural Sciences	Plant Sciences	Donald F. Wetherell	University of Connecticut	Regeneration in plants		
Natural Sciences	Plant Sciences	Robert Thayer Wilce	University of Massachusetts	Arctic benthic marine algae of the Canadian Northwest and Greenland		
Natural Sciences	Plant Sciences	Samuel G. Wildman	University of California, Los Angeles			
Natural Sciences	Statistics	Roy Radner	University of California, Berkeley	Theory of resource allocation planning and decentralization	Also won in 1961	
Natural Sciences	Statistics	Jacob Wolfowitz	Cornell University	Mathematical statistics and information theory		
Social Sciences	Anthropology and Cultural Studies	Cyril S. Belshaw	University of British Columbia	Comparative study of the performance of social systems		
Social Sciences	Anthropology and Cultural Studies	Eugene Alfred Hammel	University of California, Berkeley	Structure of social networks in industrial centers of Yugoslavia		
Social Sciences	Anthropology and Cultural Studies	Robert Francis Spencer	University of Minnesota	Poetry of West Pakistan as a reflection of nationalist, religious and social expression		
Social Sciences	Economics	Robert Wayne Clower	Northwestern University			
Social Sciences	Economics	Phoebus J. Dhrymes	University of Pennsylvania			
Social Sciences	Economics	Peter Arthur Diamond	University of California, Berkeley	Microeconomic study of economic growth and business cycles, including an analysis of alternative government policies	Also won in 1982	
Social Sciences	Economics	Thomas A. Marschak	University of California, Berkeley	Economic decentralization in Yugoslavia		
Social Sciences	Economics	Richard A. Musgrave	Princeton University		Also won in 1951	
Social Sciences	Education	Geraldine M. Joncich	University of California, Berkeley	Biography of Edward L. Thorndike		
Social Sciences	Law	Roger Fisher	Harvard University			
Social Sciences	Law	John T. Noonan	University of Notre Dame	Matrimonial cases in the courts of the Roman Catholic Church	Also won in 1979	
Social Sciences	Law	Harry H. Wellington	Yale University	Regulation of the labor market and the protection of the individual in an industrial society		
Social Sciences	Political Science	Edward C. Banfield	Harvard University			
Social Sciences	Political Science	Michael Brecher	McGill University	Analysis of Israel's foreign policy		
Social Sciences	Political Science	Joseph Hamburger	Yale University	Political ideas of Mackintosh, Macaulay, and Bagehot and their roles in 19th-century English liberalism	Also won in 1969	
Social Sciences	Political Science	Henry Alfred Kissinger	Harvard University			
Social Sciences	Political Science	Arnold Austin Rogow	Stanford University	Influence of psychoanalysis and psychotherapy on the values of the community		
Social Sciences	Political Science	Alvin Z. Rubinstein	University of Pennsylvania			
Social Sciences	Political Science	Dankwart A. Rustow	Columbia University			
Social Sciences	Political Science	Robert Anthony Scalapino	University of California, Berkeley	Japanese labor movement and trends in Asian communism resulting from the Sino-Soviet dispute		
Social Sciences	Psychology	Martin Braine	Walter Reed Army Institute of Research			
Social Sciences	Psychology	Roger William Brown	Harvard University			
Social Sciences	Psychology	James E. Dittes	Yale University	Psychological analysis of regulating functions of religion		
Social Sciences	Psychology	Harrison G. Gough	University of California, Berkeley	Cross-cultural similarities in psychological factors related to socialization		
Social Sciences	Psychology	Theodore R. Sarbin	University of California, Berkeley	Conceptual framework of behavior pathology		
Social Sciences	Psychology	Stanley E. Seashore	University of Michigan			
Social Sciences	Psychology	Gertrud L. Wyatt	Wellesley Public Schools			
Social Sciences	Sociology	William Josiah Goode	Columbia University	Family systems and social mobility patterns	Also won in 1983	

== Latin American and Caribbean Fellows ==
Category	Field of Study	Fellow	Institutional association	Research topic	Notes	Ref
Creative Arts	Fine Arts	Enrique Castro-Cid			Also won in 1964	
Creative Arts	Fine Arts	Roberto De Lamonica	Museum of Modern Art, Rio de Janeiro			
Creative Arts	Fine Arts	Luis Felipe Noé			Also won in 1966	
Creative Arts	Music Composition	Alcides Lanza				
Creative Arts	Music Composition	Edgar Valcárcel			Also won in 1967	
Humanities	Architecture, Planning and Design	Santiago Sebastián	University of Valle			
Humanities	English Literature	Alicia Jurado				
Natural Sciences	Astronomy and Astrophysics	José Luis Sérsic	Argentine National Observatory			
Natural Sciences	Earth Science	Fausto Luiz de Souza Cunha	National Museum of Brazil			
Natural Sciences	Mathematics	Manfredo Perdigão do Carmo			Also won in 1968	
Natural Sciences	Medicine and Health	Oscar Brunser Tesarschü	University of Chile		Also won in 1967	
Natural Sciences	Medicine and Health	Ronald Aliston Irvine	University of the West Indies			
Natural Sciences	Medicine and Health	Manuel López Ortiz	Pontificia Universidad Javeriana		Also won in 1964	
Natural Sciences	Molecular and Cellular Biology	Marco Aurelio Rivarola	Hospital de Niños		Also won in 1963	
Natural Sciences	Molecular and Cellular Biology	Fernando Bastarrachea Avilés	Instituto Politécnico Nacional		Also won in 1966	
Natural Sciences	Molecular and Cellular Biology	Silvio Bruzzone	Bacteriology Institute of Chile		Also won in 1952	
Natural Sciences	Organismic Biology and Ecology	Werner Bokermann	Secretary of Agriculture, São Paulo			
Natural Sciences	Organismic Biology and Ecology	Eduardo del Solar Osses	University of Chile		Also won in 1966	
Natural Sciences	Plant Sciences	Armando Dugand	National University of Colombia		Also won in 1966	
Natural Sciences	Plant Sciences	Novencido Escobar Arecho	University of Panama			
Natural Sciences	Plant Sciences	María Teresa Murillo Pulido	National University of Colombia		Also won in 1964	
Natural Sciences	Plant Sciences	Juan V. Pancho	University of the Philippines			
Natural Sciences	Plant Sciences	Victor Manuel Patiño Rodríguez	Agricultural Research Office in Bogotá		Also won in 1955, 1956	
Natural Sciences	Plant Sciences	Ramón Riba y Nava Esparza	National Autonomous University of Mexico			
Social Sciences	Anthropology and Cultural Studies	Julián Bernardo Cáceres Freyre	Instituto Nacional de Antropología e Historia			
Social Sciences	Anthropology and Cultural Studies	José Luis Franco Carrasco				
Social Sciences	Anthropology and Cultural Studies	Ramiro Matos Mendieta	National University of the Center of Peru		Also won in 1966	
Social Sciences	Anthropology and Cultural Studies	Mario Ferreira Simões	Museu Paraense Emílio Goeldi			
Social Sciences	Law	Fred Albert Phillips	McGill University			

== See also ==
- Guggenheim Fellowship
- List of Guggenheim Fellowships awarded in 1964
- List of Guggenheim Fellowships awarded in 1966
