= Mildred Albert =

American fashion commentator (1905–1991)

- Born: Mildred Elizabeth Levine; January 14, 1905; Russian Empire
- Died: August 26, 1991 (aged 86); Boston, Massachusetts, United States
- Burial place: Sharon Memorial Park, United States
- Other name: The "Mighty Atom"
- Education: Sargent School of Physical Education
- Occupations: Fashion show writer, producer, and commentator Modeling agency director Society columnist
- Years active: 1936–1991
- Spouse: James Albert
- Children: 3

Mildred Elizabeth Albert (née Levine; January 14, 1905 – August 26, 1991) was an American fashion commentator, modeling agency director, fashion show producer, radio and television personality, and society columnist. Known as the "Mighty Atom" and Boston's "First Lady of Fashion", she produced thousands of fashion shows during her career. She founded the Academie Moderne finishing school in 1936 and co-founded the Hart Model Agency in 1944. After selling both concerns in 1981, she remained active on the Boston fashion scene, covering fashion shows and hosting charity benefits, which earned her the title of "official grande dame" of Boston.

== Early life and marriage ==
Mildred Elizabeth Levine was the youngest of four children born in Russia to Thomas Levine and Elizabeth Sugarman Levine. The family, who were Jewish, left Russia following pogroms and immigrated to the United States when Mildred was three months old, settling in Roxbury, Massachusetts. Her father worked in construction and real estate development in Brookline.

She graduated from the Sargent School of Physical Education in 1926. In 1928 she married James Albert, a Harvard-educated attorney. They had two daughters and one son, residing in Beacon Hill with a summer house in Beverly Farms. Her husband gave her the nickname "Mighty Atom" based on her new initials, M. A., and her high-energy personality.

== Career ==
Wear what you enjoy. But look in the mirror and be your own judge as to how you look. If you are over 20 and do not have long, slim legs, don't wear mid-thigh skirts. Even if you have long, slim legs, it's offensive to see old people trying to look 16. You have to understand what you can and cannot wear.

— Mildred Albert, 1990

After graduation, Albert taught gym at Somerville High School. Following her marriage, she began teaching dance, art, and literature at the Florence Street Settlement House in Boston. She also taught posture at Massachusetts General Hospital and gave private lessons in poise and etiquette.

In 1936 she founded the Academie Moderne finishing school in her Beacon Hill home. The curriculum included "poise, proper walking, and good diction" and cultural visits to museums and ballet performances. The school moved along with the Alberts to their next address at 35 Commonwealth Avenue; ownership of the house was transferred from the Alberts to the Academie Moderne in 1942.

In 1944 Albert, together with Francis and Muriel Williams Hart, co-founded Hart Model Agency and Promotions, Inc. to train women for modeling careers. This agency, too, operated out of Albert's home. The Albert family continued to reside at 35 Commonwealth Avenue until 1967, when they moved to another address. The Academie Moderne and Hart Modeling Agency operated out of 35 Commonwealth Avenue into the 1980s.

As dean of the modeling agency, Albert began staging new types of fashion shows, including "around-the-pool fashion shows, luncheon fashion shows, and the first cocktail fashion shows". She developed industry contacts by hosting a weekend luncheon and fashion show at a local hotel that attracted 500 to 600 attendees, and drew top-name designers to the city by inviting them to cocktail parties at her home.

Albert produced thousands of fashion shows during her career. Among her biggest events were a show for the 100th anniversary of the National Association of Cotton Manufacturers and the Million Dollar Back Bay Fashion Show. She scripted, produced and commentated on the thrice-daily fashion shows presented at the New England Pavilion at the 1964 New York World's Fair and reported on the first White House fashion show in 1968. During the 1970s she was a coordinator for the Miss Massachusetts beauty pageants. She lent her name and financial support to stage fashion shows benefiting the charities of the March of Dimes, UNICEF, DuPont, Celanese, United States Rubber Company, and others.

Each month she made the rounds of design studios and shows in New York City, and visited Europe biannually to interview top designers and report back on fashion trends and forecasts. She also spoke to women's clubs and other groups. She became known as Boston's "First Lady of Fashion".

In 1981 Albert sold both the finishing school and the modeling agency, continuing as dean emeritus of the former and consultant at the latter. Into her 80s, she continued to be active on the Boston fashion scene. In 1985 she inaugurated a Saturday-afternoon luncheon and fashion show at the Ritz-Carlton Hotel in Boston which she ran until a few months before her death. Seven hundred well-wishers attended her 82nd birthday party; recorded tributes were sent by Calvin Klein, Bill Blass, and Oscar de la Renta.

== Radio and television personality ==
Albert also became a radio and television personality. She hosted a weekly radio show called "Youthful Loveliness" on WEEI in the late 1930s, and "Fashion As I See It" on WCRB in the 1960s and 1970s. In the 1950s she joined the CBS New England lecture circuit, speaking on the topic "Gracious Living", and also began appearing on television programs on fashion and beauty. In the 1980s she joined CBS' Good Day program as a fashion-show reporter and conducted interviews with leading designers in Paris, London, Rome, New York, and Boston, including Geoffrey Beene, Bill Blass, Pierre Cardin, Coco Chanel, Oscar de la Renta, Christian Dior, Norman Hartnell, Halston, Anne Klein, Ralph Lauren, Emilio Pucci, Simonetta, and Pauline Trigere. From 1981 to 1991 she wrote a society column spotlighting fashion shows and charity benefits for Tab newspapers.

== Memberships ==
She was a board member of the Hebrew Teachers College in Newton Centre, Massachusetts, in the 1920s and 1930s.

== Awards and honors ==
She received the 1975 Fashion Show Consultant of the Year Award from the March of Dimes. State of Israel Bonds honored her with its 35th Anniversary Award in 1983. Massachusetts Governor Michael Dukakis honored her with a proclamation on October 29, 1986. Boston Mayor Raymond Flynn declared April 19, 1990, as "Mildred Albert Day" and named her Boston's "official grand dame".

== Death and legacy ==
She died in Boston on August 26, 1991, at the age of 86. Her funeral was held at Temple Israel and she was buried at Sharon Memorial Park in Sharon, Massachusetts.

The Mildred Levine Albert Papers, 1910–1991, are housed at the Schlesinger Library at Radcliffe College.
