= Robert Yost =

Robert Yost may refer to:

- Robert L. Yost (1922–1990), American diplomat
- Robert M. Yost (1917–2006), philosopher at the University of California in Los Angeles
