= Bibliography of the Victorian era =

Works about the United Kingdom and British Empire during the reign of Queen Victoria.

== General ==
- Bailey, Peter. Leisure and class in Victorian England: Rational recreation and the contest for control, 1830–1885 (Routledge, 2014).
- Best, Geoffrey. Mid-Victorian Britain, 1851–1875 (Weidenfeld & Nicolson, 1971)
- Bourne, Kenneth. The foreign policy of Victorian England, 1830–1902 (1970) online, survey plus primary documents
- Briggs, Asa. The Age of Improvement 1783–1867 (1979), Wide-ranging older survey emphasizing the reforms. online
- Cevasco, G. A. ed. The 1890s: An Encyclopedia of British Literature, Art, and Culture (1993) 736pp; short articles by experts
- Chadwick, Owen. The Victorian Church (2 vol 1966), covers all denominations online
- Clark, G. Kitson The making of Victorian England (1963). online
- Ensor, R. C. K. England, 1870–1914 (1936) online influential scholarly survey
- Gregg, Pauline. A Social and Economic History of Britain: 1760–1950 (1950) online
- Harrison, J.F.C. Early Victorian Britain 1832–1851 (Fontana, 1979).
- Harrison, J.F.C. Late Victorian Britain 1875–1901 (Routledge, 2013).
- Heilmann, Ann, and Mark Llewellyn, eds. Neo-Victorianism: The Victorians in the Twenty-First Century, 1999–2009 (Palgrave Macmillan; 2011) 323 pages; looks at recent literary & cinematic, interest in the Victorian era, including magic, sexuality, theme parks, and the postcolonial
- Hilton, Boyd. A Mad, Bad, and Dangerous People?: England 1783–1846 (New Oxford History of England. 2006); in-depth scholarly survey, 784pp.
- Hobsbawm, Eric (1997). The Age of Capital, 1848–1875. London: Abacus.
- McCord, Norman; Purdue, Bill (2007). British History, 1815–1914 (2nd ed.). Oxford, England: Oxford University Press. Archived from the original on 2015-10-15 – via Questia.
- Paul, Herbert. History of Modern England, 1904–6 (5 vols) online free
- Perkin, Harold. The Origins of Modern English Society: 1780–1880 (1969) online
- Hoppen, K. Theodore. The Mid-Victorian Generation 1846–1886 (New Oxford History of England) (2000), comprehensive scholarly history excerpt and text search
- Roberts, Clayton and David F. Roberts. A History of England, Volume 2: 1688 to the present (2013) university textbook; 1985 edition online
- Somervell, D. C. English thought in the nineteenth century (1929) online
- Steinbach, Susie L. Understanding the Victorians: Politics, Culture and Society in Nineteenth-Century Britain (2012) excerpt and text search
- Swisher, Clarice, ed. Victorian England (2000) 20 excerpts from leading primary and secondary sources regarding literary, cultural, technical, political, and social themes. online free
- Woodward, E. L. The Age of Reform: 1815–1870 (1954) comprehensive scholarly survey online

== Daily life and culture ==
- Aston, Jennifer, Amanda Capern, and Briony McDonagh. "More than bricks and mortar: female property ownership as economic strategy in mid-nineteenth-century urban England." Urban History 46.4 (2019): online
- Biscoff, Christopher "Teaching Britain: Elementary Teachers and the state of the everyday (1846-1906)" (2019) ISBN 978-0198833352 Discusses the training, careers, experiences and views of teachers in England and Scotland.
- Flanders, Judith. Inside the Victorian Home: A Portrait of Domestic Life in Victorian England. W.W. Norton & Company: 2004. ISBN 0-393-05209-5.
- Gold, Michael. "History through Literary Imagination: Portrayals of Worker Representation and Collective Action in Condition-of-England Novels, c.1830–1855" Historical Studies in Industrial Relations, (2025) Vol. 46: 1-51. online
- Hellerstein, Erna H.; Hume, Leslie P.; Offen, Karen M., eds. (1981). Victorian Women: A Documentary Account of Women’s Lives in 19th Century England, France, and the United States. Stanford, CA: Stanford University Press. ISBN 9780804710886.
- Houghton, Walter E. (1957). The Victorian frame of mind, 1830–1870. New Haven: Yale Univ. Press. ISBN 978-0-300-00122-8.
- May, Trevor (1994). The Victorian Schoolroom. Great Britain: Shire Publications. Short book covering various aspects of, mainly, state-funded education in England and Wales. Situation in Scotland and Ireland is only touched on.
- Mitchell, Sally. Daily Life in Victorian England. Greenwood Press: 1996. ISBN 0-313-29467-4.
- O'Gorman, Francis, ed. The Cambridge companion to Victorian culture (2010)
- Roberts, Adam Charles, ed. Victorian culture and society: the essential glossary (2003).
- Thompson, F. M. L. Rise of Respectable Society: A Social History of Victorian Britain, 1830–1900 (1988) Strong on family, marriage, childhood, houses, and play.
- Weiler, Peter. The New Liberalism: Liberal Social Theory in Great Britain, 1889–1914 (Routledge, 2016).
- Wilson, A. N. The Victorians. Arrow Books: 2002. ISBN 0-09-945186-7
- Young, Gerard Mackworth, ed. Early Victorian England 1830-1865 (2 vol 1934) scholarly surveys of cultural history. vol 2 online

== Literature ==
- Adams, James Eli. A History of Victorian Literature (Wiley, 2011).
- Altick, Richard Daniel. Victorian People and Ideas: A Companion for the Modern Reader of Victorian Literature. (1974) online free
- Felluga, Dino Franco, et al. The Encyclopedia of Victorian Literature (2015).
- Flint, Kay. The Cambridge History of Victorian Literature (2014).
- Horsman, Alan. The Victorian Novel (Oxford History of English Literature, 1991)
- Purchase, Sean. Key Concepts in Victorian Literature (2006)

== Politics ==
- Aydelotte, William O. “Parties and Issues in Early Victorian England.” Journal of British Studies, 5#2 1966, pp. 95–114. online
- Boyd, Kelly and Rohan McWilliam, eds. The Victorian Studies Reader (2007) 467pp; articles and excerpts by scholars excerpts and text search
- Bright, J. Franck. A History of England. Period 4: Growth of Democracy: Victoria 1837–1880 (1902) online 608pp; highly detailed older political narrative
  - A History of England: Period V. Imperial Reaction, Victoria, 1880‒1901 (1904) online
- Brock, M. G. "Politics at the Accession of Queen Victoria" History Today (1953) 3#5 pp 329–338 online.
- Brown, David, Robert Crowcroft, and Gordon Pentland, eds. The Oxford Handbook of Modern British Political History, 1800–2000 (2018) excerpt
- Burton, Antoinette, ed. Politics and Empire in Victorian Britain: A Reader. Palgrave Macmillan: 2001. ISBN 0-312-29335-6
- Marriott, J. A. R. England Since Waterloo (1913); focus on politics and diplomacy; online
- Martin, Howard.Britain in the 19th Century (Challenging History series, 2000) 409pp; textbook; emphasizing politics, diplomacy and use of primary sources
- Trevelyan, G. M. British History in the Nineteenth Century and After (1782–1901) (1922). online very well written scholarly survey
- Walpole, Spencer. A History of England from the Conclusion of the Great War in 1815 (6 vol. 1878–86), very well written political narrative to 1855; online
  - Walpole, Spencer. History of Twenty-Five Years (4 vol. 1904–1908) covers 1856–1880; online
- Young, G. M. "Mid-Victorianism" History Today (1951) 1#1 online.

== Religion ==
- Armstrong, Anthony. The Church of England, The Methodists and Society, 1700 –1850 (1973).
- Aronsfeld, Caesar C. "German Jews in Victorian England." The Leo Baeck Institute Yearbook 7.1 (1962): 312-329.
- Bebbington, David W. Evangelicalism in Modern Britain: A History from the 1730s to the 1980s (Routledge, 2003) online
- Beck, George A. The English Catholics 1850-1950 (1950) online
- Bradley, Ian. The Call to Seriousness: The Evangelical Impact on the Victorians (1976). online
- Brown, Stewart J. Providence and Empire: Religion, politics and society in the United Kingdom. 1815–1914 (Routledge, 2014) online
- Chadwick, Owen, The Victorian Church: Vol 1 1829–1859 (1966); Victorian Church: Part two 1860–1901 (1979); a major scholarly survey; vol 1 online also see online vol 2
- Clark, G. Kitson. The Making of Victorian England (1962) pp. 147–205.
- Davies, Rupert E. et al. A History of the Methodist Church in Great Britain (3 vol. Wipf & Stock, 2017). online
- Flindall, R.P. The Church of England 1815–1948: A documentary history (1972).
- Gilbert, Alan C. Religion and Society in Industrial England: Church, Chapel and Social Change, 1740 ––1914 (Longman, 1976).
- Hopkins, Mark. Nonconformity's romantic generation: evangelical and liberal theologies in Victorian England (Wipf and Stock, 2007).
- Hylson-Smith, Kenneth. The churches in England from Elizabeth I to Elizabeth II (1996).
- Scotland, Nigel. "Evangelicals, Anglicans and Ritualism in Victorian England." Churchman 111.3 (1997): 249-265. online
- Stiles, Andrina. Religion, society and reform, 1800-1914 (1995) online
- Urdank, Albion M. Religion and Society in a Cotswold Vale: Nailsworth, Gloucestershire, 1780-1865 (U of California Press, 1990) online
- Wolff, Robert Lee. Gains and losses: novels of faith and doubt in Victorian England (1977) online
- Woodward, Llewellyn. The Age of Reform, 1815-1870 (1962) pp. 502–528. online
- Horace Mann (1854). Census of Great Britain, 1851: Religious Worship in England and Wales. Ge. Routledge.

== Crime and punishment ==
- Auerbach, Sascha (2015). "'Beyond the pale of mercy': Victorian penal culture, police court missionaries, and the origins of probation in England" (PDF). Law and History Review. 33 (3): 621–663. doi:10.1017/S0738248015000280. S2CID 142101025.
- Bailey, Victor. Policing and punishment in nineteenth century Britain (2015).
- Churchill, David. Crime Control and Everyday Life in the Victorian City (Oxford UP, 2018)
- Emsley, Clive. Crime and society in England: 1750–1900 (2013).
- Emsley, Clive. "Crime in 19th Century Britain." History Today 38 (1988): 40+
- Emsley, Clive. The English Police: A Political and Social History (2nd ed. 1996) also published as The Great British Bobby: A History of British Policing from the 18th Century to the Present (2010)excerpt
- Fox, Lionel W. (1998). The English Prison and Borstal Systems. Psychology Press. p. 46. ISBN 9780415177382.
- Gatrell, V. A. C. "Crime, authority and the policeman-state." in E.M.L. Thompson, ed., The Cambridge social history of Britain 1750-1950: Volume 3 (1990). 3:243-310
- Hay, Douglas. "Crime and justice in eighteenth-and nineteenth-century England." Crime and Justice 2 (1980): 45–84. online
- Kilday, Anne-Marie. "Women and crime." Women's History, Britain 1700–1850 ed. Hannah Barker and Elaine Chalus, (Routledge, 2004) pp. 186–205.
- May, Margaret. "Innocence and experience: the evolution of the concept of juvenile delinquency in the mid-nineteenth century." Victorian Studies 17.1 (1973): 7–29. online
- Radzinowicz, Leon. A History of English Criminal Law and Its Administration from 1750 (5 vol. 1948–1976)
- Radzinowicz, Leon and Roger Hood The Emergence of Penal Policy in Victorian and Edwardian England (1990)
- Shore, Heather (2000). "The Idea of Juvenile Crime in 19th Century England". History Today. 50 (6).
- Shore, Heather. "Crime, policing and punishment." in Chris Williams, ed., A companion to nineteenth-century Britain (2007): 381–395. excerpt
- Storch, R. D. (1980). "Crime And Justice in 19th-Century England". History Today. 30: 32–37.
- Taylor, James (2018). "White-collar crime and the law in nineteenth-century Britain" (PDF). Business History. 60 (3): 343–360. doi:10.1080/00076791.2017.1339691. S2CID 157785396.
- Tobias, J. J. Crime and Industrial Society in the Nineteenth Century (1967) .
- Tobias, J.J. ed, Nineteenth-century crime: prevention and punishment (1972) primary sources.
- Taylor, Howard. "Rationing crime: the political economy of criminal statistics since the 1850s." Economic history review (1998) 51#3 569–590. online

== Historiography ==
- Burton, Antoinette (2012). "Victorian History: Some Experiments with Syllabi". Victorian Studies. 54 (2). doi:10.2979/victorianstudies.54.2.305. S2CID 142936859.
- Elton, G. R. Modern Historians on British History 1485–1945: A Critical Bibliography 1945–1969 (1969), annotated guide to 1000 history books on every major topic, plus book reviews and major scholarly articles. online
- Gooch, Brison D. (1973). "Recent Literature on Queen Victoria's Little Wars". Victorian Studies. 17 (2): 217–224. JSTOR 3826186.
- Goodlad, Lauren M. E. (2000). "'A Middle Class Cut into Two': Historiography and Victorian National Character". ELH. 67 (1): 143–178. doi:10.1353/elh.2000.0003. S2CID 161748511.
- Homans, Margaret, and Adrienne Munich, eds. Remaking Queen Victoria (Cambridge University Press, 1997)
- Kent, Christopher (1996). "Victorian social history: post-Thompson, post-Foucault, postmodern". Victorian Studies. 1996 (1): 97–133. JSTOR 3828799.
- Mays, Kelly J (2011). "Looking backward, looking forward: the Victorians in the rear-view mirror of future history". Victorian Studies. 53 (3): 445. doi:10.2979/victorianstudies.53.3.445. S2CID 143253052.
- Moore, D. C. "In Search of a New Past: 1820 – 1870," in Richard Schlatter, ed., Recent Views on British History: Essays on Historical Writing since 1966 (Rutgers UP, 1984)
- Parry, J. P. (1983). "The State of Victorian Political History". Historical Journal. 26 (2): 469–484. doi:10.1017/S0018246X00024201. JSTOR 2638778. S2CID 162264240.
- Sandiford, Keith A. P. (1981). "The Victorians at play: Problems in historiographical methodology". Journal of Social History. 1981 (2): 271–288. doi:10.1353/jsh/15.2.271. JSTOR 3787112.
- Stansky, Peter. "British History: 1870 – 1914," in Richard Schlatter, ed., Recent Views on British History: Essays on Historical Writing since 1966 (Rutgers UP, 1984)
- Taylor, Miles (2020). "The Bicentenary of Queen Victoria". Journal of British Studies. 59 (1): 121–135. doi:10.1017/jbr.2019.245. S2CID 213433777.
- Vernon, James (2005). "Historians and the Victorian Studies Question". Victorian Studies. 47 (2). doi:10.2979/VIC.2005.47.2.272. S2CID 145307328.
- Webb, R. K. Modern England: from the 18th century to the present (1968) online widely recommended university textbook

== Primary sources ==
- Black, E.C. ed. British politics in the nineteenth century (1969) online
- Bourne, Kenneth. The foreign policy of Victorian England, 1830–1902 (Oxford UP, 1970), contains a short narrative history and 147 "Selected documents" on pp 195–504. online
- Handcock, W.D. and G.M. Young, eds. English Historical Documents, Vol. XII(1): 1833–1874
- Handcock, W.D. ed. English Historical Documents, 1874-1914 (1977) online
- English Historical Documents 1815-1870 (1964) online
- Hicks, Geoff, et al. eds. Documents on Conservative Foreign Policy, 1852–1878 (2013), 550 documents excerpt
- Temperley, Harold and L.M. Penson, eds. Foundations of British Foreign Policy: From Pitt (1792) to Salisbury (1902) (1938), of primary sources online
