= Alicia Jurado =

Argentinian writer (1922–2011)

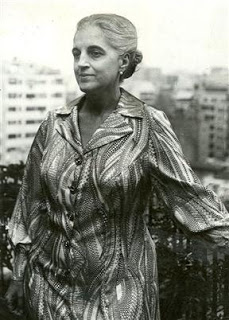
- Alicia Jurado (1965)
- Born: May 22, 1922; Buenos Aires, Argentina
- Died: May 9, 2011 (aged 88); Buenos Aires
- Education: University of Buenos Aires
- Occupations: writer; academic
- Spouse: Eduardo Tiscornia (m. 1944; div. 1953)
- Children: 2
- Writing career
- Language: Spanish
- Genre: Biography

Alicia Jurado (May 22, 1922 - May 9, 2011) was an Argentine writer and academic. She spoke English and French, she knew Italian and understood German. Although most of her reading was done in English, rather than in French or Spanish, she wrote her works in the latter language. She was a full member of the Academia Argentina de Letras, a member of the Royal Spanish Academy, and a corresponding member of the Academia Chilena de la Lengua. Jurado was a collaborator and friend of Victoria Ocampo and Jorge Luis Borges.

== Early life and education ==
Alicia Jurado was born in Buenos Aires, May 22, 1922. She was the only daughter of José Antonio Jurado and Ilve Fernández Blanco. She lived her early childhood on the El Retiro ranch, near Pardo, Buenos Aires Province, and later moved to the city of Buenos Aires.

Jurado studied at the Liceo Nacional de Señoritas No. 1. She received a degree in Natural Sciences from the University of Buenos Aires.

== Career ==
She completed a biography of William Henry Hudson in England and the United States, through a Guggenheim Fellowship, which she published in 1971, and of Cunninghame Graham , through a Fulbright Foundation grant, which was published in 1978. She wrote the first biography of Jorge Luis Borges, titled Genio y figura de Borges, which had several reissues.

In 1980, Jurado was named a full member of the Academia Argentina de Letras and took the place left vacant by Victoria Ocampo. She was also a member of the Royal Spanish Academy and a corresponding member of the Academia Chilena de la Lengua since November 1988. Jurado received distinctions such as the Primer Premio Municipal de Novela y de Ensayo (First Municipal Prize for Novels and Essays), the SADE Honor Sash (1961), and the Alberti-Sarmiento Inter-American Prize (1975).

== Personal life ==
In 1944, she married the lawyer Eduardo Tiscornia, and had two children: Federico (1946–1975, agronomist) and Cecilia (1947-, doctor). The couple was legally divorced in 1953.

Alicia Jurado died in Buenos Aires, May 9, 2011.

== Selected works ==
- 1961 - La cárcel y los hierros
- 1964 - Genio y figura de Jorge Luis Borges
- 1965 - Leguas de polvo y sueño
- 1967 - En soledad vivía
- 1968 - Los rostros del engaño
- 1971 - Vida y obra de W. H. Hudson
- 1974 - El cuarto mandamiento
- 1976 - Qué es el budismo (with Jorge Luis Borges)
- 1978 - El escocés errante
- 1981 - Los hechiceros de la tribu
- 1989 - Descubrimiento del mundo
- 1990 - El mundo de la palabra
- 1992 - Las despedidas
- 1999 - Trenza de cuatro
- 2001 - Revisión del pasado
- 2003 - Epílogo (Memorias 1992 - 2002)
- 2006 - Poemas de Juventud

== See also ==
- List of Guggenheim Fellowships awarded in 1965
