= Gertrud L. Wyatt =

Austrian-born American psychologist (1903–1993)

- Born: Gertrud Schmidt; October 14, 1903; Vienna, Austria
- Died: November 4, 1993 (aged 90); Wellesley, Massachusetts, U.S.
- Occupation: Psychologist
- Awards: Guggenheim Fellowship (1965)

Academic background
- Education: University of Music and Performing Arts Vienna; University of Vienna; Boston University
- Thesis: Mother-child relationships and stuttering in children (1958)
- Doctoral advisor: Chester C. Bennett

Academic work
- Discipline: Psychology
- Institutions: Vienna Psychoanalytic Society; Wellesley Public Schools

Gertrud Lasch Wyatt (née Schmidt; October 14, 1903 – November 4, 1993) was an Austrian-born American psychologist and education academic. Originally a radio personality for Radio Wien and a voice theory educator, she was educated at the University of Vienna and was part of the Vienna Psychoanalytic Society before fleeing Austria after the Anschluss. After spending a year in London, she settled in Massachusetts, where she was full-time psychologist and director of speech services for Wellesley Public Schools from 1953 and 1974. As an academic, she was a 1965 Guggenheim Fellowship and wrote the 1969 book Language Learning and Communication Disorders in Children.

== Biography ==
=== Early life and career in Europe ===
Gertrud Schmidt was born on October 14, 1903, in Vienna, Austria. After studying at a women's gymnasium and the University of Music and Performing Arts Vienna, she worked as a radio personality performing prose and poetry readings for stations based in German-speaking Europe, including Radio Wien. She started work as a part-time assistant at University of Vienna's Voice and Speech Clinic, (Note: Sources differ as to how long she worked there. Wyatt said on her dissertation autobiography that she worked there from 1926 until 1936, but the Reports of the President and the Treasurer says it was from 1930 until 1937.) before becoming a voice therapy professor at Max Reinhardt Seminar in 1931. In addition to her voice teaching work, she obtained her absolutorium at the University of Vienna in 1933, where Karl Bühler and Emil Fröschels taught her, and in 1936, she joined the Vienna Psychoanalytic Society's institute as part of Anna Freud and August Aichhorn's Seminar for Educators.

On 13 March 1938, Austria was annexed into Nazi Germany. The institute subsequently closed, and being an anti-Nazi socialist, she subsequently fled alongside the Freud family. She eventually ended up in London, where she spent a year studying at the University of London Department of Child Development and working as a research associate at Paddington Green Children's Hospital, before moving to the United States the year after.

=== Emigration to the United States and later career ===
During World War II, she worked part-time speech therapy jobs at Massachusetts General Hospital and Children's Hospital Boston, leading the latter's outpatient speech clinic. After the war ended, she started her own private practice and became a naturalized citizen of the United States in 1945, before joining Wellesley Public Schools in 1951. At Wellesley Public Schools, she originally started as a consultant before she was promoted to full-time psychologist and director of speech services in 1953, holding the position until 1974.

In addition to Wellesley Public Schools, she also worked at Harvard Graduate School of Education and the Boston University Wheelock College of Education & Human Development, in both cases as a clinical associate and intern supervisor. In 1957 or 1958, she obtained her PhD in psychology from Boston University; her dissertation, titled Mother-child relationships and stuttering in children, was supervised by Chester C. Bennett.

She was awarded a Guggenheim Fellowship in 1965, for "a study of language development and language disorders in children". Known by the Portland Press Herald to have "gained a national reputation for her ability to present her ideas to parents and teachers", she wrote the book Language Learning and Communication Disorders in Children (1969), based on her prior research on language-based learning disabilities with funding from National Institutes of Health. In addition to numerous journal articles, she contributed to the 1965 manual for the Massachusetts Chapter of the American Academy of Pediatrics.

=== Personal life, death, and legacy ===
In 1923, she married Fritz Lasch, director of the Villach State Hospital. The two divorced in 1931, and Lasch married into the Helldorff noble family. She married psychoanalyst Frederick Wyatt in 1938, remaining together until 1952. Their only child, Cornelia Wyatt, was a journalist who was part of The New York Times, Town & Country, and Wall Street Journal staff teams, before dying from diabetes complications in 1984. In 1989, she published an autobiography called Mother and Daughter: A Personal Biography.

On November 4, 1993, Wyatt died of congestive heart failure in Wellesley, Massachusetts, where she had lived for the past few decades.

Some of her correspondence is part of the Papers of Gordon W. Allport within the Harvard University Archives.

== Publications ==
- Language Learning and Communication Disorders in Children (1969)
