= Edith Fishtine Helman =

Edith Fishtine Helman (September 19, 1905 – March 31, 1994) was an American scholar of the Spanish Enlightenment and professor at Simmons College.

== Personal life ==
Helman was born on September 19, 1905, in Boston, Massachusetts, to Russian immigrants Kallman Fishtine and Rose Esther Fishtine. As a child, she attended the Boston Public Schools through high school.

She studied at Simmons College for one year in 1921 before transferring to Boston University's College of Liberal Arts where she received a bachelor's degree in 1925. After graduation, she studied for a year at the University of Paris. Returning to the United States, she studied at Radcliffe College in 1926 and 1927. She then earned a master's degree in 1927 and a doctorate in 1930 from Bryn Mawr College.

In 1938, she married Bernard Helman, a Boston lawyer. (Note: Bernard died in 1968.) The couple lived in Cambridge, Massachusetts and at their vacation home in Rockport, Massachusetts. The poet May Sarton signed a number of poems and gave them to Helman.

Helman died at her home in Rockport on March 31, 1994. She was buried in Sharon Memorial Park.

== Career ==
=== Professor ===
As a French and Spanish professor, Helman taught first at Bryn Mawr and then joined the Simmons faculty as an Assistant Professor of Spanish in 1932. Helman also worked as a lecturer at Tufts University, Wellesley College, and the University of Massachusetts, Amherst. Her research interests included Goya, Jorge Guillén, Jovellanos, and Pedro Salinas.

Supported by grants and fellowships, she traveled throughout both Spain and South America, conducting research on Spanish Enlightenment thinkers and writers. In 1934 and 1962, the American Council of Learned Societies gave her grants to study in Spain. A 1940 fellowship offered by Pan-American Airlines through the U.S. State Department allowed her to study at the Universidad de San Marcos in Peru.

The Alice Freeman Palmer Fellowship allowed her to conduct research in Spain on Spanish Enlightenment thinkers and writers in 1949 and 1950. She returned to Spain to study the same topic from 1965 to 1966 on a Guggenheim Fellowship. At Simmons, Helman helped to establish the Lyle K. Bush Art Fund to create a permanent collection of art on campus.

=== Works by Helman ===
Helman was associate editor of Norton Publishing's Spanish Book Series and the co-editor of a collection of short stories written in Spanish for college students.

Books written and edited by Helman include:

- Cuentos Contemporaneos, ed. Doris King Arjona and Edith Fishtine. New York, NY: W.W. Norton and Company, Inc., 1935.
- Don Juan Valero: The Critic, Edith Fishtine. Bryn Mawr, Pennsylvania: Edith Fishtine, 1933.
- Jovellanos y Goya, Edith Helman. Madrid, Spain: Taurus Ediciones, S.A., 1970.
- La Zapatera Prodigiosa, by Federico García Lorca, ed. Edith F. Helman. New York, NY: W.W. Norton & Company, Inc., 1952.
- Los "Capriochos" de Goya, Edith Helman. Spain: Salvat Editores S.A. -- Alianza Editorial, S.A., 1971.
- Narradores de Hoy, ed. Edith Helman and Doris King Arjona. New York, NY: W.W. Norton & Company, Inc., 1966.
- Trasmundo de Goya, Edith Helman. Madrid, Spain: Alianza Forma, 1963, 1983,1986, 1993

=== Other ===
In the 1930s and 1940s, Helman worked as an editor at The Christian Science Monitor.

== Honors ==
Helman was inducted into the Hispanic Society of America in 1953, elected a fellow the American Academy of Arts and Sciences in 1956, and became a member of Phi Beta Kappa at Boston University in 1967. Helman was elected an honorary member of the National Romance Language Honor Society in 1971, and entered the Collegium of Distinguished Alumni of the College of Liberal Arts at Boston University on March 30, 1974. She was elected a member of the Royal Academy of Fine Arts in Spain in June 1977.

In January 1971, Helman retired as Professor of Spanish Emeritus at Simmons College. The following year, she received an honorary doctorate from Simmons. Her papers are held at the college.
