= Sharon Memorial Park, Massachusetts =

Jewish cemetery in Massachusetts

Coordinates: 42°8′45″N 71°10′22″W

Sharon Memorial Park
- Interactive map of Sharon Memorial Park

Details
- Established: 1948
- Location: Sharon, Massachusetts
- Type: Jewish cemetery
- Size: 317 acres (128 ha)

Sharon Memorial Park is a Jewish cemetery founded in 1948 located in Sharon, Massachusetts. The cemetery is situated on 317 acres of land within the towns of Sharon and Canton.

== Notable interments ==
- Irving Fine (1914–1962), composer and conductor
- Richard Frank (1953–1995), actor
- Elizabeth Glaser (1947–1994), AIDS activist and former wife of actor Paul Michael Glaser
- Melvin J. Glimcher
- Edith Fishtine Helman (1905–1994), professor at Simmons College
- Minuetta Kessler (1914–2002), concert pianist, classical music composer, and educator
- Simon Kuznets (1901–1985), Nobel Prize recipient
- Daniel Lewin (1970–2001), entrepreneur who co-founded Akamai Technologies and September 11 attacks victim
- Sumner Redstone (1923–2020), National Amusements and Viacom chairman
- William Rosenberg (1916–2002), founder of Dunkin' Donuts
- Mark Sandman (1952–1999), rock musician and songwriter
- Ruth Wallis (1920–2007), cabaret singer
