= Reginald Horsman =

English-born American historian (1931–2025)

- Born: October 24, 1931; Leeds, Yorkshire, England
- Died: August 20, 2025 (aged 93); Milwaukee, Wisconsin, U.S.
- Education: University of Birmingham; Indiana University Bloomington
- Occupation: Historian

Reginald Horsman (October 24, 1931 – August 20, 2025) was an English-born American historian.

== Early life and career ==
Horsman was born in Leeds, Yorkshire, the son of William Alfred Horsman and Elizabeth Thompson. He attended the University of Birmingham, earning his bachelor's degree in 1952 and his master's degree in 1955. He also attended Indiana University Bloomington, earning his PhD degree in American history in 1958.

Horsman served as a professor in the department of history at the University of Wisconsin–Milwaukee from 1964 to 1999. During his years as a professor, in 1973, he was named a distinguished professor.

== Personal life and death ==
In 1955, Horsman married Lenore McNabb, a pianist. Their marriage lasted until her death in 2023.

Horsman died in Milwaukee, Wisconsin, on August 20, 2025, at the age of 93.
