= Lona Mosk Packer =

American literary scholar and editor

- Born: October 9, 1918; Denver, Colorado, U.S.
- Died: April 30, 1965 (aged 46); Los Angeles, California, U.S.
- Occupations: Literary scholar; editor
- Awards: Guggenheim Fellowship (1965)

Academic background
- Education: University of California, Los Angeles
- Thesis: Beauty for ashes: a biographical study of Christina Rossetti's poetry (1957)

Academic work
- Sub-discipline: Christina Rossetti
- Institutions: University of California, Santa Barbara; Lewis & Clark College; University of Utah

Lona Mosk Packer (October 9, 1918 – April 30, 1965) was an American literary scholar and editor. In 1964, she published a titular biography of English poet Christina Rossetti and The Rossetti-Macmillan Letters. A professor at the Lewis & Clark College and University of Utah, she was awarded a Guggenheim Fellowship in 1965, the same year she died.

== Biography ==
Packer was born on October 9, 1918, in Denver, Colorado. She attended the University of California, Los Angeles, where she obtained her BA in 1951, MA in 1953, and PhD in 1957; her doctoral dissertation was Beauty for ashes: a biographical study of Christina Rossetti's poetry.

She briefly worked at University of California, Santa Barbara as an English instructor from 1956 to 1957. In 1957, she joined the Lewis & Clark College Department of English, working there as an assistant professor of English until 1958. After working as a visiting lecturer at University of Utah since 1960, she was promoted to assistant professor in 1962.

In 1964, Packer published her titular biography of English poet Christina Rossetti. The same year, she also released The Rossetti-Macmillan Letters, an edited volume of letters associated with the poet, most of which had not been previously released in Packer's work. In 1965, she was awarded a Guggenheim Fellowship for an edition of the poetry of Christina Rossetti. Ingrid Hotz-Davies said that Packer is "probably the most dedicated of searchers after known and unknown lovers in Christina Rossetti".

Packer died on April 30, 1965, in Los Angeles. Her son was classical scholar James E. Packer, who dedicated his 1971 book The Insulae of Imperial Ostia to her.

== Bibliography ==
- Christina Rossetti (1964)
- (as editor) The Rossetti-Macmillan Letters (1964)
