= Walter Houghton =

American historian (1904–1983)

Walter Edwards Houghton (September 21, 1904 in Stamford, Connecticut - April 11, 1983) was an American historian of Victorian literature, best known for editing the Wellesley Index to Victorian Periodicals.

== Biography ==
Houghton was educated at Yale University, where he graduated in 1924 and was a member of Skull and Bones. He taught at Harvard University before moving to Wellesley College in 1942. He remained at Wellesley until retirement in 1969. With his wife Esther he continued to work on the Wellesley Index: three volumes appeared before his death, and two more volumes were completed for publication after his death.

== Works ==
- The Art of Newman's 'Apologia'
- The Formation of Thomas Fuller's 'Holy and Profane States (1938)
- The Victorian Frame of Mind, 1830 - 1870 (Yale University Press, 1957)(Copyright renewed 1985)
- The Poetry of Clough: An Essay in Revaluation (1963)
- Victorian Poetry and Poetics (co-authored with G.R. Stange)
- The Wellesley Index to Victorian Periodicals, 1824-1900 (Toronto: University of Toronto Press). Vol I, 1965; Vol II, 1972; Vol III, 1978; Vol IV, 1987; Vol V, 1988
