= Robert M. Yost =

American philosopher

Robert Morris Yost (1917–2006) was a philosopher at the University of California in Los Angeles (UCLA). UCLA offers the Robert M. Yost Prize in philosophy in honor of his notable achievements in the field.

Professor Yost was known for his singular, entertaining mode of teaching philosophy, a field not known for its engaging humor. Yost defied self-regarding habits in professing philosophy. At times, he performed dialogues in class, adopting the voice of a naive inquisitive student, followed by the voice of a somewhat befuddled respondent professor. The effect was surprisingly comical. He made philosophy live in such moments. He was beloved by students.
