= Helldorff =

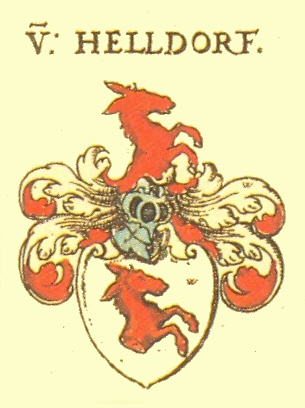
Wappen der Meißner Adelsfamilie Helldorf

Helldorff is a surname. Notable people with the surname include:

- Carl von Helldorff, German politician (1804-1860)
- Johann Heinrich von Helldorff, chamberlain and canon in Saxony
- Karl von Helldorff, Prussian landowner and politician
- Otto von Helldorff (1833–1908), German politician (German Conservative Party)
- Wolf-Heinrich Graf von Helldorff (1896–1944), German SA-Obergruppenführer, German police official and politician
