= XIV Corps (German Empire) =

Section of the Imperial German army

XIV Army Corps XIV. Armee-Korps
- Flag of the Staff of a Generalkommando (1871–1918)
- Active: 30 September 1870 - March 1871; 1 July 1871 - 1919
- Country: German Empire: Baden
- Type: Corps
- Size: Approximately 44,000 (on mobilisation in 1914)
- Garrison/HQ: Karlsruhe/Werderpalais, Bismarckstraße 2
- Patron: Grand Duke of Baden
- Shoulder strap piping: Red
- Engagements: Franco-Prussian War Battle of Villersexel Battle of the Lisaine World War I Battle of the Frontiers Battle of Mulhouse Battle of Passchendaele

Insignia
- Abbreviation: XIV AK

The XIV Army Corps / XIV AK (German: XIV. Armee-Korps) was a corps level command of the German Army before and during World War I. It was, effectively, also the army of the Grand Duchy of Baden, which, in 1871, had been integrated into the Prussian Army command structure, as had the armies of most German states. Both divisions and the bulk of the corps' support units were from the grand duchy. The corps was established in 1870, after the Siege of Strasbourg.

It was assigned to the V Army Inspectorate, which became the 7th Army at the start of the First World War. It was still in existence at the end of the war as part of the 18th Army, Heeresgruppe Deutscher Kronprinz on the Western Front.

== Franco-Prussian War ==
A siege corps was formed to besiege Strasbourg during the Franco-Prussian War under the command of General der Infanterie August von Werder. After the fall of Strasbourg, these troops were formed into a new XIV Corps by the All-highest Cabinet Order (Allerhöchste Kabinettsorder, AKO) of 30 September 1870.

Werder defeated the French at Dijon and at Nuits and proceeded to besiege Belfort. General Charles Denis Bourbaki assembled an army intending to relieve Belfort, leading to the Battle of Villersexel. On 15 January 1871, Bourbaki attacked Werder along the Lisaine River; however, after a three-day battle, he was repelled and his army retreated into Switzerland.

XIV Corps was disbanded in March 1871.

== Re-formation ==
After the peace treaty, the XIV Corps was re-established on 1 July 1871 almost exclusively with troops from the Grand Duchy of Baden.

It was assigned to the V Army Inspectorate, but joined the 7th Army at the start of the First World War.

== Peacetime organisation ==
The 25 peacetime Corps of the German Army (Guards, I - XXI, I - III Bavarian) had a reasonably standardised organisation. Each consisted of two divisions with usually two infantry brigades, one field artillery brigade and a cavalry brigade each. Each brigade normally consisted of two regiments of the appropriate type, so each Corps normally commanded 8 infantry, 4 field artillery and 4 cavalry regiments. There were exceptions to this rule:

V, VI, VII, IX and XIV Corps each had a 5th infantry brigade (so 10 infantry regiments)
II, XIII, XVIII and XXI Corps had a 9th infantry regiment
I, VI and XVI Corps had a 3rd cavalry brigade (so 6 cavalry regiments)
the Guards Corps had 11 infantry regiments (in 5 brigades) and 8 cavalry regiments (in 4 brigades).

Each Corps also directly controlled a number of other units. This could include one or more

Foot Artillery Regiment
Jäger Battalion
Pioneer Battalion
Train Battalion

Peacetime organization of the Corps
| Corps | Division | Brigade | Units | Garrison |
|---|---|---|---|---|
| XIV Corps | 28th Division | 55th Infantry Brigade | 109th (1st Baden) Life Grenadiers | Karlsruhe |
| XIV Corps | 28th Division | 55th Infantry Brigade | 110th (2nd Baden) Grenadiers "Emperor William I" | Mannheim, II Bn at Heidelberg |
| XIV Corps | 28th Division | 56th Infantry Brigade | 40th (Hohenzollern) Fusiliers "Prince Charles Anton of Hohenzollern" | Rastatt |
| XIV Corps | 28th Division | 56th Infantry Brigade | 111th (3rd Baden) Infantry "Margrave Ludwig William" | Rastatt |
| XIV Corps | 28th Division | 28th Field Artillery Brigade | 14th (1st Baden) Field Artillery "Grand Duke" | Karlsruhe |
| XIV Corps | 28th Division | 28th Field Artillery Brigade | 50th (3rd Baden) Field Artillery | Karlsruhe |
| XIV Corps | 28th Division | 28th Cavalry Brigade | 20th (1st Baden) Life-Dragoons | Karlsruhe |
| XIV Corps | 28th Division | 28th Cavalry Brigade | 21st (2nd Baden) Dragoons | Bruchsal, Schwetzingen |
| XIV Corps | 29th Division | 57th Infantry Brigade | 113th (5th Baden) Infantry | Freiburg im Breisgau |
| XIV Corps | 29th Division | 57th Infantry Brigade | 114th (6th Baden) Infantry "Emperor Frederick III" | Konstanz |
| XIV Corps | 29th Division | 58th Infantry Brigade | 112th (4th Baden) Infantry "Prince William" | Mülhausen/Elsaß |
| XIV Corps | 29th Division | 58th Infantry Brigade | 142nd (7th Baden) Infantry | Mülhausen/Elsaß, II Bn at Müllheim |
| XIV Corps | 29th Division | 84th Infantry Brigade | 169th (8th Baden) Infantry | Lahr, II Bn at Villingen |
| XIV Corps | 29th Division | 84th Infantry Brigade | 170th (9th Baden) Infantry | Offenburg, III Bn at Donaueschingen |
| XIV Corps | 29th Division | 29th Field Artillery Brigade | 30th (2nd Baden) Field Artillery | Rastatt |
| XIV Corps | 29th Division | 29th Field Artillery Brigade | 76th (5th Baden) Field Artillery | Freiburg im Breisgau |
| XIV Corps | 29th Division | 29th Cavalry Brigade | 22nd (3rd Baden) Dragoons "Prince Charles" | Mülhausen/Elsaß |
| XIV Corps | 29th Division | 29th Cavalry Brigade | 5th Jäger zu Pferde | Mülhausen/Elsaß |
| XIV Corps | Corps Troops | | 14th (Baden) Foot Artillery | Straßburg, Müllheim |
| XIV Corps | Corps Troops | | 14th (Baden) Pioneer Battalion | Kehl |
| XIV Corps | Corps Troops | | 4th Telegraph Battalion | Karlsruhe, Freiburg im Breisgau |
| XIV Corps | Corps Troops | | 4th Airship Battalion | Mannheim, Metz, Lahr, Friedrichshafen |
| XIV Corps | Corps Troops | | 14th (Baden) Train Battalion | Durlach |
| XIV Corps | Karlsruhe Defence Command (Landwehr-Inspektion) | | | Karlsruhe |

14th (Baden) Foot Artillery was partially garrisoned in Straßburg (as part of XV Corps) and Müllheim (as part of XIV Corps). In addition, the 66th (4th Baden) Field Artillery was stationed in Lahr and Neubreisach as part of XV Corps.

== World War I ==
=== Organisation on mobilisation ===
On mobilization on 2 August 1914, the Corps was restructured. The 28th Cavalry Brigade was withdrawn to form part of the 6th Cavalry Division and the 29th Cavalry Brigade was broken up and its regiments assigned to the divisions as reconnaissance units. The divisions received engineer companies and other support units from the Corps headquarters. Unusually, the Corps retained its 5th Infantry brigade, making it the strongest active corps on mobilisation. In summary, XIV Corps mobilised with 30 infantry battalions, 10 machine gun companies (60 machine guns), 8 cavalry squadrons, 24 field artillery batteries (144 guns), 4 heavy artillery batteries (16 guns), 3 pioneer companies and an aviation detachment.

Initial wartime organization of the Corps
| Corps | Division | Brigade | Units |
|---|---|---|---|
| XIV Corps | 28th Division | 55th Infantry Brigade | 109th Life Grenadier Regiment |
| XIV Corps | 28th Division | 55th Infantry Brigade | 110th Grenadier Regiment |
| XIV Corps | 28th Division | 56th Infantry Brigade | 40th Fusilier Regiment |
| XIV Corps | 28th Division | 56th Infantry Brigade | 111th Infantry Regiment |
| XIV Corps | 28th Division | 28th Field Artillery Brigade | 14th Field Artillery Regiment |
| XIV Corps | 28th Division | 28th Field Artillery Brigade | 50th Field Artillery Regiment |
| XIV Corps | 28th Division | | 5th Jäger zu Pferde Regiment |
| XIV Corps | 28th Division | | 2nd Company, 14th Pioneer Battalion |
| XIV Corps | 28th Division | | 3rd Company, 14th Pioneer Battalion |
| XIV Corps | 28th Division | | 28th Divisional Pontoon Train |
| XIV Corps | 28th Division | | 2nd Medical Company |
| XIV Corps | 29th Division | 57th Infantry Brigade | 113th Infantry Regiment |
| XIV Corps | 29th Division | 57th Infantry Brigade | 114th Infantry Regiment |
| XIV Corps | 29th Division | 58th Infantry Brigade | 112th Infantry Regiment |
| XIV Corps | 29th Division | 58th Infantry Brigade | 142nd Infantry Regiment |
| XIV Corps | 29th Division | 84th Infantry Brigade | 169th Infantry Regiment |
| XIV Corps | 29th Division | 84th Infantry Brigade | 170th Infantry Regiment |
| XIV Corps | 29th Division | 29th Field Artillery Brigade | 30th Field Artillery Regiment |
| XIV Corps | 29th Division | 29th Field Artillery Brigade | 76th Field Artillery Regiment |
| XIV Corps | 29th Division | | 22nd Dragoon Regiment |
| XIV Corps | 29th Division | | 1st Company, 14th Pioneer Battalion |
| XIV Corps | 29th Division | | 29th Divisional Pontoon Train |
| XIV Corps | 29th Division | | 1st Medical Company |
| XIV Corps | 29th Division | | 3rd Medical Company |
| XIV Corps | Corps Troops | | II Battalion, 14th Foot Artillery Regiment |
| XIV Corps | Corps Troops | | 20th Aviation Detachment |
| XIV Corps | Corps Troops | | 14th Corps Pontoon Train |
| XIV Corps | Corps Troops | | 14th Telephone Detachment |
| XIV Corps | Corps Troops | | 14th Pioneer Searchlight Section |
| XIV Corps | Corps Troops | | Munition Trains and Columns corresponding to II Corps |

=== Combat chronicle ===
At the outbreak of World War I, the Corps was assigned to the 7th Army on the left of the forces that executed the Schlieffen Plan and fought in the Battle of the Frontiers. In September, it was transferred to the 6th Army. From November 1916 to March 1917, the corps took command of Group Hardaumont of the 5th Army. In March 1917, it was transferred to the 3rd Army and took command of Group Prosnes. In May, it was transferred to the 4th Army's control and took command of Group Dixmude. During this period, it fought in the Battle of Passchendaele. Taking over from the XIX Corps at Wijtschate in November 1917, the XIV Corps formed a new Group Wytschaete, which it commanded until December 1917, after which it took over Group Busigny in the 6th Army. It remained in command of this group into 1918.

It was still in existence at the end of the war as part of the 18th Army, Heeresgruppe Deutscher Kronprinz on the Western Front.

== Commanders ==
The XIV Corps had the following commanders during its existence:

| Dates | Rank | Name |
|---|---|---|
| 30 September 1870 | General der Infanterie | August von Werder |
| 15 April 1879 | General der Infanterie | Hugo von Obernitz |
| 10 August 1888 | General der Infanterie | Sigismund von Schlichting |
| 2 January 1896 | General der Kavallerie | Adolf von Bülow |
| 27 January 1901 | General der Infanterie | Max von Bock und Polach |
| 11 September 1907 | General der Infanterie | Ernst Freiherr von Hoiningen gen. Huene |
| 31 August 1914 | Generalleutnant | Theodor von Watter |
| 10 March 1915 | Generalleutnant | Karl von Hänisch |
| 12 August 1916 | Generalleutnant | Martin Chales de Beaulieu |
| 5 September 1917 | Generalleutnant | Alfred von Böckmann |
| 2 November 1917 | Generalleutnant | Friedrich von Gontard |

== See also ==
- Armee-Abteilung B
- German Army order of battle (1914)
- German Army order of battle, Western Front (1918)
- List of Imperial German infantry regiments
- List of Imperial German artillery regiments
- List of Imperial German cavalry regiments

== Bibliography ==
- Claus von Bredow, bearb., Historische Rang- und Stammliste des deutschen Heeres (1905)
- Cron, Hermann (2002). Imperial German Army 1914-18: Organisation, Structure, Orders-of-Battle [first published: 1937]. Helion & Co. ISBN 1-874622-70-1.
- Ellis, John; Cox, Michael (1993). The World War I Databook. Aurum Press Ltd. ISBN 1-85410-766-6.
- Haythornthwaite, Philip J. (1996). The World War One Source Book. Arms and Armour. ISBN 1-85409-351-7.
- Sheldon, J. (2007). The German Army at Passchendaele. London: Pen and Sword. ISBN 978-1-84415-564-4.
- Histories of Two Hundred and Fifty-One Divisions of the German Army which Participated in the War (1914-1918), compiled from records of Intelligence section of the General Staff, American Expeditionary Forces, at General Headquarters, Chaumont, France 1919. The London Stamp Exchange Ltd. 1989 [1920]. ISBN 0-948130-87-3.
- The German Forces in the Field; 7th Revision, 11th November 1918; Compiled by the General Staff, War Office. Imperial War Museum, London and the Battery Press. 1995 [1918]. ISBN 978-1-870423-95-3.
