= Martin Chales de Beaulieu =

German general

Chales de Beaulieu
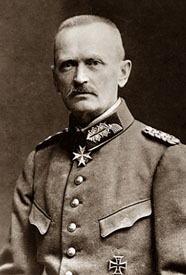
- Beaulieu after 1917
- Born: 11 November 1857; Brandenburg, Kingdom of Prussia
- Died: 27 April 1945 (aged 87); Nazi Germany
- Military career
- Allegiance: Prussia; German Empire
- Branch: Prussian Army; Schutztruppe
- Service years: 1877–1917
- Rank: Generalleutnant char. General der Infanterie
- Commands: Chief of Staff, II Corps; 32nd Infantry Regiment; 74th Infantry Brigade; 12th Division; XIV Corps
- Conflicts: Herero Wars; World War I
- Awards: Pour le Mérite

Franz Martin Chales de Beaulieu (11 November 1857 – 27 April 1945) was a German general in World War I. He was also involved in the Herero Wars as chief of staff to Lothar von Trotha.

== Life ==
Franz Martin Chales de Beaulieu was born as son of Eduard Chales de Beaulieu on 11 November 1857.

In 1877, Beaulieu entered the Prussian Army as a Fahnenjunker in the 2nd Guards Grenadier Regiment. On 12 October 1877, Beaulieu was appointed as Second-Lieutenant. In 1887, Beaulieu was promoted to Premier-Lieutenant. In 1891, Beaulieu became the adjutant of Alfred von Schlieffen, the Chief of the German General Staff. In 1894, Beaulieu was again with the 2nd Guards Grenadier Regiment in Berlin. He then served in the staff of the 2nd Guards Division before becoming a major on 18 November 1897; then serving on the staff of the VI Corps. In 1901, he was once more with the 2nd Guards Grenadier Regiment and in 1902, Beaulieu again became an adjutant of Alfred von Schlieffen. In 1903, Beaulieu served as a section chief in the general staff and, on 24 April 1904, he was promoted to Oberstleutnant. After his promotion, Beaulieu became part of the Schutztruppe and became chief of staff to General Lothar von Trotha during the Herero Wars. Afterwards Beaulieu returned to Germany and became chief of staff of the II Corps. On 16 October 1905, Beaulieu became the commander of the 32nd Infantry Regiment. He was promoted to Oberst in 1907 and Generalmajor in 1911. He became the commander of 74th Infantry Brigade. On 25 June 1913, Beaulieu became a Generalleutnant and commander of the 12th Division.

At the outbreak of the World War I, Beaulieu's 12th Division was part of the 4th Army under Albrecht, Duke of Württemberg. The division accordingly served on the Western Front nd participated in the Battle of the Ardennes. In 1916 the Oberste Heeresleitung named Beaulieu commander of the XIV Corps, replacing Karl von Hänisch. On 5 September 1917, Beaulieu received the Pour le Mérite from Wilhelm II for his actions in the war. On the same day Beaulieu was removed from his position and retired. Shortly after his retirement, on 3 January 1918, Beaulieu was given the character of a General der Infantrie.

== Awards ==
=== German Awards ===
- Prussia
  - Iron Cross (1914) First and Second Class
  - Pour le Mérite, 5 September 1917
  - Order of the Red Eagle 2nd Class
  - Service award
- Kingdom of Bavaria
  - Military Merit Order 3rd Class with Swords
- Kingdom of Saxony
  - Albert Order Officer's Cross
- (Saxe-Coburg and Gotha) (Duchy of Saxe-Altenburg) (Saxe-Meiningen) Ernestine duchies
  - Commander of Order of the White Falcon
  - Commander of 1st Class of the Saxe-Ernestine House Order
- Kingdom of Württemberg
  - Cross of Honor of Order of the Crown with Swords
  - Knight's Cross 1st Class Friedrich Order

=== Foreign Awards ===
- Kingdom of Italy
  - Officer Cross of Order of Saints Maurice and Lazarus
  - Officer Cross of Order of the Crown of Italy
- Austro-Hungary
  - Knight's Cross of Order of Leopold (Austria)
  - Order of the Iron Crown (Austria) 3rd Class
  - Knight's Cross of Order of Franz Joseph
- Kingdom of Romania
  - Commander of Order of the Crown (Romania)
