= Albert Mayer (soldier) =

First German soldier killed in WWI

Albert Otto Walter Mayer
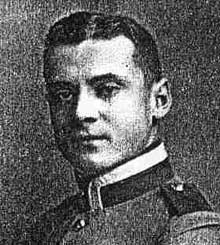
- Mayer c. 1912–1914
- Born: 24 April 1892; Magdeburg, Saxony-Anhalt, German Empire
- Died: 2 August 1914 (aged 22); Joncherey, Territoire de Belfort, France
- Burial place: Illfurth German Military Cemetery, Alsace, France
- Military career
- Allegiance: German Empire
- Branch: Imperial German Army
- Service years: 1912–1914
- Rank: Leutnant
- Units: Jäger Regt-zu-Pferd Nr 5, 29th Cavalry Brigade, 29th Infantry Division
- Conflicts: World War I: Skirmish at Joncherey †

Albert Otto Walter Mayer (24 April 1892 – 2 August 1914) was the first soldier of the Imperial German Army to die in World War I. He died one day before the German Empire formally declared war on France, in the same skirmish in which Jules-André Peugeot became the first French soldier to die.

== Early life ==
Albert Otto Walter Mayer was born on 24 April 1892 at Magdeburg, Saxony-Anhalt. His family had moved to the area of Mulhouse, Alsace, when he was a boy. He enlisted into the Imperial German Army in 1912. In August 1914, he was a lieutenant in his local cavalry unit, the Jäger Regt-zu-Pferd Nr 5, which was part of the 29th Cavalry Brigade of the 29th Infantry Division, garrisoned in Mulhouse.

== Death ==
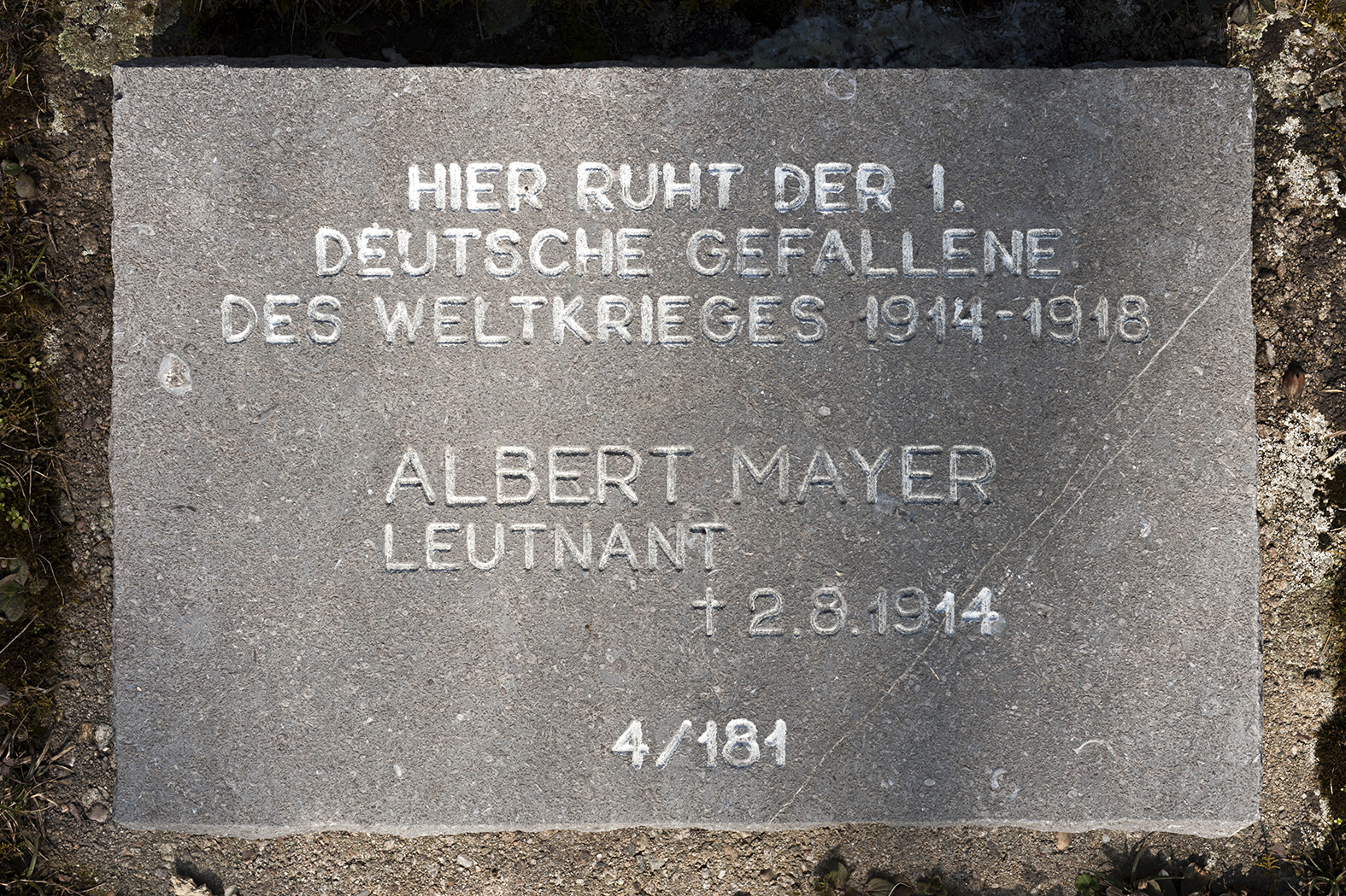
Mayer's gravestone

During the morning of 2 August 1914, a cavalry patrol led by Mayer crossed into France before war had been officially declared. Upon entering French territory, the patrol was confronted by a French Army sentry, who escaped after Mayer attacked him with his sabre. Around 9.30 a.m., the German patrol entered the village of Joncherey. French soldiers billeted nearby were notified and deployed to confront the German intruders. At 10:00 a.m., Corporal Jules-André Peugeot, leading the French troops, saw the German force and shouted a command to stop as they were under arrest, to which Mayer pulled out his pistol and shot at Peugeot, hitting him in the shoulder and mortally wounding him. Peugeot, in turn, fired his weapon at Mayer but missed. Other soldiers of Peugeot's detachment then opened fire at the Germans, hitting Mayer in the stomach and head, killing him, with the remainder of the German patrol fleeing the scene.

Mayer's body was buried in Joncherey the next day. The body was later removed to the German military cemetery at Illfurth near Mulhouse, where his gravestone is marked with the inscription "1st German Casualty of the World War 1914–18". His helmet was retrieved by the French authorities and today is on display at the Musée de l'Armée in Paris.

== See also ==
=== First soldiers killed in World War I ===
- Jules-André Peugeot, the first French Army soldier killed, 2 August 1914
- Antoine Fonck, the first Belgian Army soldier killed, 4 August 1914
- John Parr, the first British Army soldier killed, 21 August 1914
- Thomas Enright, one of the first three American Army soldiers killed, 3 November 1917
- Merle Hay, one of the first three American Army soldiers killed, 3 November 1917
- James Bethel Gresham, one of the first three American Army soldiers killed, 3 November 1917

=== Last soldiers killed in World War I ===
- George Edwin Ellison, the last British Army soldier killed, at 9:30 a.m., 11 November 1918
- Augustin Trébuchon, the last French Army soldier killed, at 10:45 a.m., 11 November 1918
- Marcel Toussaint Terfve, the last Belgian Army soldier killed, at 10:45 a.m., 11 November 1918
- George Lawrence Price, the last Canadian Army soldier killed, at 10:58 a.m., 11 November 1918
- Henry Gunther, the last soldier and last American Army soldier killed, at 10:59 a.m., 11 November 1918
