= 52nd Infantry Division (German Empire) =

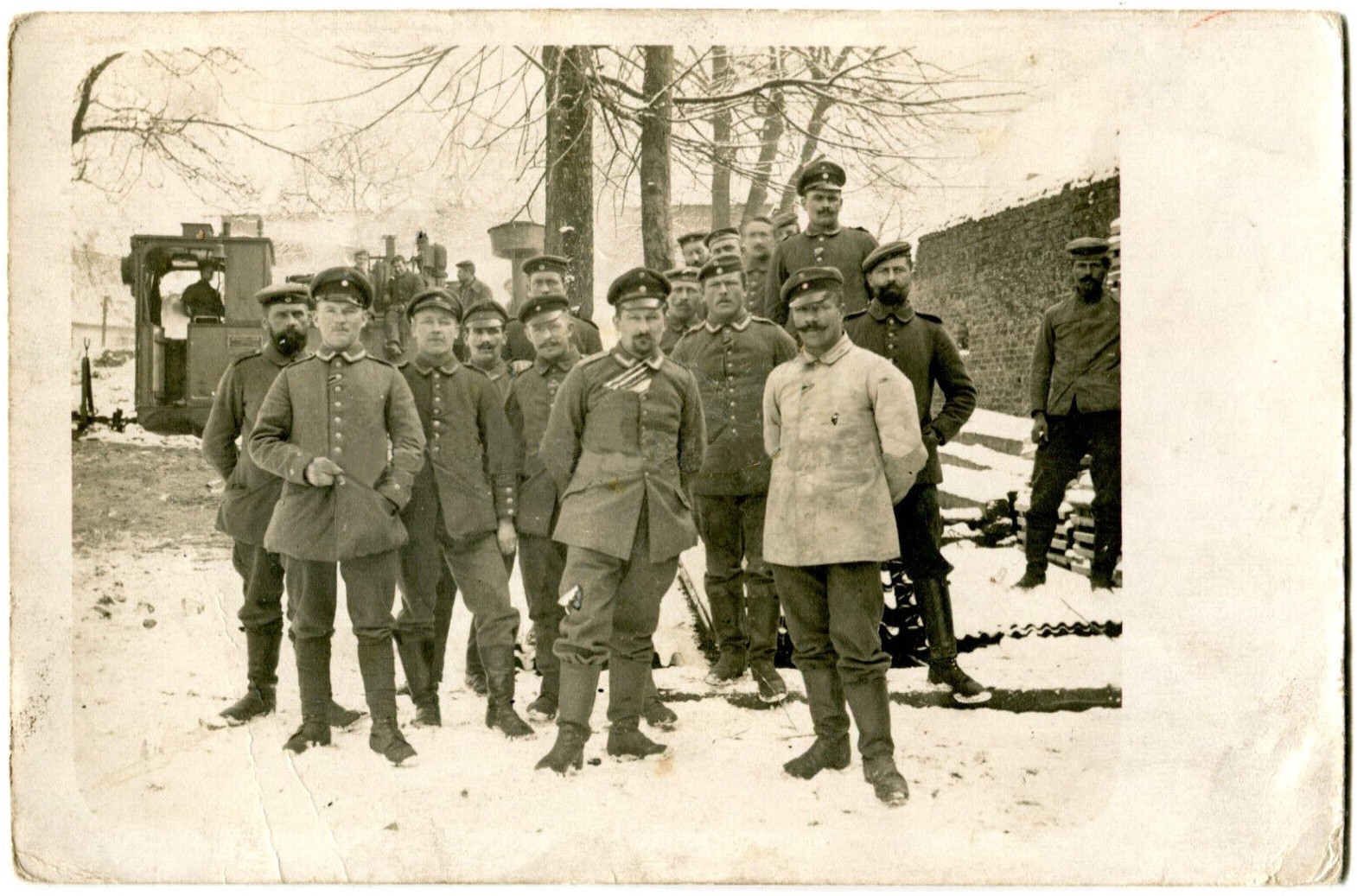
Soldiers of the 52nd Infantry Division in front of a light railway locomotive (March 16, 1916)

The 52nd Infantry Division (52.Infanterie-Division) was a division of the Imperial German Army during World War I. The division was formed on March 6, 1915, from units taken from other divisions or newly raised. The division was initially mixed, with two infantry regiments from the Grand Duchy of Baden, one infantry regiment from Prussian Saxony, and Prussian and Baden support units (cavalry, artillery, engineers, and service and support units). While the infantry regiments and the divisional cavalry squadron were regular army units, the rest of the division was made up of reserve units and units formed during the war. The 66th Magdeburg Infantry Regiment was taken from the 7th Infantry Division, and the 169th and 170th Infantry Regiments were taken from Baden's 29th Infantry Division. The 52nd Infantry Division became more Baden as the war progressed, as the 66th Magdeburg Infantry Regiment, the regiment from Prussian Saxony, was replaced on April 6, 1917, by Baden's 111th Infantry Regiment "Margrave Ludwig Wilhelm".

Shortly after its formation, the division went into the line facing the British Army near Arras, France, on the Western Front. In 1916, the division fought in the Battle of the Somme. The division remained on the Western Front for the duration of the war, although it moved to various sectors. Allied intelligence rated it one of the best German divisions.

== Order of battle on March 6, 1915 ==
- 104. Infanterie-Brigade
  - 3. Magdeburgisches Infanterie-Regiment Nr. 66
  - 8. Badisches Infanterie-Regiment Nr. 169
  - 9. Badisches Infanterie-Regiment Nr. 170
  - Radfahrer-Kompanie Nr. 52
- 4.Eskadron/Ulanen-Regiment Hennigs von Treffenfeld (Altmärkisches) Nr. 16
- 52.Feldartillerie-Brigade
  - Badisches Feldartillerie-Regiment Nr. 103
  - Badisches Feldartillerie-Regiment Nr. 104
  - Fußartillerie-Bataillon Nr. 52
- Pionier-Kompanie Nr. 103
- Pionier-Kompanie Nr. 104

== Order of battle on February 11, 1918 ==
- 104.Infanterie-Brigade
  - Infanterie-Regiment Markgraf Ludwig Wilhelm (3. Badisches) Nr. 111
  - 8. Badisches Infanterie-Regiment Nr. 169
  - 9. Badisches Infanterie-Regiment Nr. 170
  - MG-Scharfschützen-Abteilung Nr. 38
- 4.Eskadron/Ulanen-Regiment Hennigs von Treffenfeld (Altmärkisches) Nr. 16
- Artillerie-Kommandeur 52:
  - Badisches Feldartillerie-Regiment Nr. 104
  - II.Bataillon/Reserve-Fußartillerie-Regiment Nr. 17 (from 15.04.1918)
- Stab Pionier-Bataillon Nr. 137:
  - Pionier-Kompanie Nr. 103
  - Pionier-Kompanie Nr. 104
  - Minenwerfer-Kompanie Nr. 52
- Divisions-Nachrichten-Kommandeur 52

== Commanders ==
- Generalleutnant Karl von Borries (3.3.15 – 25.10.18)
- Generalmajor Eugen Glück (25.10.18 – 12.12.18)
- Generalleutnant Wilhelm Ribbentrop (12.12.18 – 23.1.19)
