= Joncherey =

- Commune
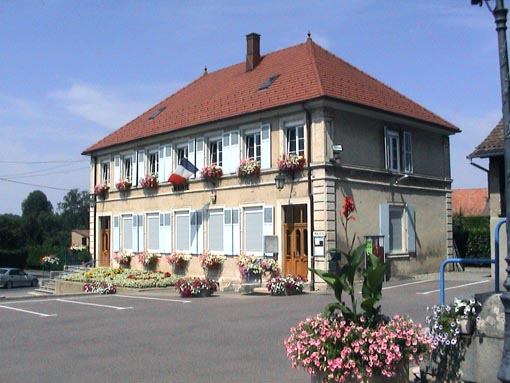
- Town hall

- Coat of arms
- Location of Joncherey
- Location within France Location within Bourgogne-Franche-Comté
- Coordinates: 47°31′47″N 7°00′07″E
- Country: France
- Region: Bourgogne-Franche-Comté
- Department: Territoire de Belfort
- Arrondissement: Belfort
- Canton: Delle
- Intercommunality: Sud Territoire

Government
  - Mayor (2020–2026): Jacques Alexandre
- Area^{1}: 5.18 km^{2} (2.00 sq mi)
- Highest elevation: 401 m (1,316 ft)
- Lowest elevation: 349 m (1,145 ft)
- Population (2023): 1,451
  - Density: 280/km^{2} (725/sq mi)
- Time zone: UTC+01:00 (CET)
  - Summer (DST): UTC+02:00 (CEST)
- INSEE/Postal code: 90056 /90100
- ^{1} French Land Register data, which excludes lakes, ponds, glaciers > 1 km^{2} (0.386 sq mi or 247 acres) and river estuaries.

Joncherey (French pronunciation: [ʒɔ̃ʃʁɛ]; Frainc-Comtou: Djoncheré) is a commune in the Territoire de Belfort department in Bourgogne-Franche-Comté in northeastern France that is known for being the place where the Skirmish at Joncherey, the first battle on the Western Front of World War I happened.

== History ==
=== Start of World War I ===
The first fatalities on the Western Front of World War I occurred in this village on 2 August 1914 at 9:59 am, one day before the formal declaration of war between Germany and France. French corporal Jules-André Peugeot was stationed in the village of Joncherey, southeast of Belfort, when he challenged a German army patrol, which had crossed the border few hours earlier. Peugeot commanded the Germans to stop and declared them under arrest. In response, the German officer commanding the patrol, Albert Mayer, pulled out his revolver and fired, hitting Peugeot in the shoulder. Despite his wound, Peugeot fired with his pistol at Mayer but missed. Peugeot's comrades then fired repeatedly at Mayer, shooting him first in the stomach and then in the head, killing him. Peugeot, severely wounded, returned to his billet, where he died from his injuries at 10:37 am.

== Geography ==
=== Climate ===
Joncherey has an oceanic climate (Köppen climate classification Cfb). The average annual temperature in Joncherey is 10.5 °C (50.9 °F). The average annual rainfall is 1,086.9 mm (42.79 in) with December as the wettest month. The temperatures are highest on average in July, at around 19.6 °C (67.3 °F), and lowest in January, at around 2.0 °C (35.6 °F). The highest temperature ever recorded in Joncherey was 39.0 °C (102.2 °F) on 7 August 2015; the coldest temperature ever recorded was −25.0 °C (−13.0 °F) on 7 January 1985.

Climate data for Joncherey (1991–2020 averages, extremes 1964−present)
Month	Jan	Feb	Mar	Apr	May	Jun	Jul	Aug	Sep	Oct	Nov	Dec	Year
Record high °C (°F)	18.0 (64.4)	22.5 (72.5)	27.0 (80.6)	29.5 (85.1)	33.0 (91.4)	37.0 (98.6)	38.1 (100.6)	39.0 (102.2)	33.0 (91.4)	29.0 (84.2)	25.5 (77.9)	21.1 (70.0)	39.0 (102.2)
Mean daily maximum °C (°F)	5.5 (41.9)	7.5 (45.5)	12.1 (53.8)	16.4 (61.5)	20.5 (68.9)	24.4 (75.9)	26.4 (79.5)	26.1 (79.0)	21.4 (70.5)	16.0 (60.8)	9.8 (49.6)	6.1 (43.0)	16.0 (60.8)
Daily mean °C (°F)	2.0 (35.6)	2.9 (37.2)	6.4 (43.5)	9.9 (49.8)	14.0 (57.2)	17.8 (64.0)	19.6 (67.3)	19.3 (66.7)	15.2 (59.4)	10.9 (51.6)	5.8 (42.4)	2.6 (36.7)	10.5 (50.9)
Mean daily minimum °C (°F)	−1.6 (29.1)	−1.7 (28.9)	0.6 (33.1)	3.4 (38.1)	7.5 (45.5)	11.1 (52.0)	12.8 (55.0)	12.4 (54.3)	9.0 (48.2)	5.8 (42.4)	1.8 (35.2)	−0.9 (30.4)	5.0 (41.0)
Record low °C (°F)	−25.0 (−13.0)	−19.6 (−3.3)	−20.0 (−4.0)	−7.5 (18.5)	−4.0 (24.8)	−0.5 (31.1)	2.5 (36.5)	0.5 (32.9)	−1.2 (29.8)	−7.5 (18.5)	−13.0 (8.6)	−21.5 (−6.7)	−25.0 (−13.0)
Average precipitation mm (inches)	82.9 (3.26)	78.0 (3.07)	78.8 (3.10)	79.9 (3.15)	102.3 (4.03)	93.2 (3.67)	83.6 (3.29)	97.8 (3.85)	82.8 (3.26)	101.0 (3.98)	97.7 (3.85)	108.9 (4.29)	1,086.9 (42.79)
Average precipitation days (≥ 1.0 mm)	12.9	11.7	11.0	10.2	13.4	10.7	10.8	10.9	9.6	12.4	12.8	14.7	141.2
Source: Météo-France

== See also ==
- Communes of the Territoire de Belfort department
