= Sigismund von Schlichting =

Wilhelm Lorenz Sigismund von Schlichting
- Born: 3 October 1829; Berlin, Province of Brandenburg, Kingdom of Prussia
- Died: 22 October 1909 (aged 80); Herischdorf, Province of Silesia, German Empire
- Military career
- Allegiance: Kingdom of Prussia (1847–1896); German Empire (1871–1896)
- Branch: Prussian Army; Imperial German Army
- Service years: 1847–1896
- Rank: General of Infantry
- Conflicts: Austro-Prussian War; Franco-German War
- Awards: Order of the Black Eagle

Sigismund Wilhelm Lorenz von Schlichting (3 October 1829 – 22 October 1909) was a Prussian general and military theorist, perhaps best known for his participation in the debates over infantry tactics in the 1880s and 1890s.

Schlichting was born in Berlin, the son of a Prussian general who was then the commander of the Kriegsakademie (War Academy). In many respects his early career was typical: he matriculated in the cadet corps and received his commission as a lieutenant at the age of 18. Instead of attending the War Academy, however, he was educated at the universities of Bonn and Göttingen. In 1861 he was promoted to captain and given command of a company. He saw action against Austria in the Seven Weeks War of 1866, and at the end of that year was promoted to major and seconded to the General Staff. Schlichting returned to the line in 1870 and commanded an infantry battalion in the Franco-Prussian War.

In 1872 Schlichting was appointed chief of staff of the VII Army Corps, based in Münster, a post which he held for two years. From 1874 to 1878 he commanded an infantry regiment at Spandau, after which he was made chief of staff of the Guard Corps, a highly prestigious position. From 1884 until 1896 Schlichting held a series of field commands, finishing as commander of the XIV Army Corps (1888–1896). Sigismund von Schlichting retired from active service in 1896 and died in 1909.

== Partial list of works ==
- Taktische und strategische Grundsätze der Gegenwart. (1898) (Tactical and Strategic Principles of the Present)
- Moltkes Vermächtniss. (1901) (Moltke's Legacy)

== See also ==
- Friedrich von Bernhardi
- Colmar Freiherr von der Goltz
- Julius von Verdy du Vernois
