= 29th Division (German Empire) =

Coordinates: 47°59′52″N 7°51′11″E

29th Division (29. Division); from 2 August 1914, 29th Infantry Division (29. Infanterie-Division)
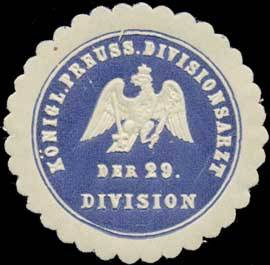
- One of the seal marks of the 29th Division
- Active: 1 July 1871–1919
- Country: Baden/Germany
- Branch: Imperial German Army
- Type: Infantry (in peacetime included cavalry)
- Size: Approx. 15,000
- Part of: XIV. Army Corps (XIV. Armeekorps)
- Garrison/HQ: Freiburg (1871-1919)
- Engagements: World War I: Battle of the Frontiers; Battle of Verdun; Battle of the Somme; Second Battle of the Aisne; Hundred Days Offensive

The 29th Division (29. Division) was a unit of the Prussian/German Army, almost entirely made up of troops from the Grand Duchy of Baden. It was formed in Karlsruhe on 1 July 1871. The division was subordinated in peacetime to the XIV Army Corps (XIV. Armeekorps). The 29th Division was disbanded in 1919 during the demobilization of the German Army after World War I.

The division, along with the other division of the XIV Army Corps, the 28th Division, was formed in the Grand Duchy of Baden, a member state of the German Empire. Both divisions grew out of the Grand Ducal Baden Division (Großherzoglich Badische Division), the army of the grand duchy. The Grand Ducal Baden Division had fought against Prussia in the Austro-Prussian War, but after Prussia's victory Baden and most other German states had entered into conventions subordinating their armies to Prussia's.

The Grand Ducal Baden Division served in the Franco-Prussian War against France in 1870-71, where its regiments saw action in the Siege of Strasbourg and the Battle of the Lisaine.

In peacetime, the 29th Division was stationed in southern Baden (the 28th covered northern Baden), with garrisons in southern Baden and across the Rhine in Alsace.

In World War I, the division served on the Western Front, seeing action at the Battle of the Frontiers and then moving north during the Race to the Sea. It participated in some of the more well-known battles and campaigns of the Western Front, including the 1916 Battle of the Somme, the later phases of the Battle of Verdun, the Second Battle of the Aisne (also known as the Third Battle of Champagne and to the Germans as the Double Battle on the Aisne and in the Champagne), and against the Allied Hundred Days Offensive.

== Pre-World War I organization ==
Before World War I, the division was larger than most, having three rather than two infantry brigades. The structure in 1914 was as follows:

- 57. Infanterie-Brigade:
  - 5. Badisches Infanterie-Regiment Nr. 113
  - 6. Badisches Infanterie-Regiment Kaiser Friedrich III Nr. 114
- 58. Infanterie-Brigade:
  - 4. Badisches Infanterie-Regiment Prinz Wilhelm Nr. 112
  - 7. Badisches Infanterie-Regiment Nr. 142
- 84. Infanterie-Brigade:
  - 8. Badisches Infanterie-Regiment Nr. 169
  - 9. Badisches Infanterie-Regiment Nr. 170
- 29. Kavallerie-Brigade:
  - 3. Badisches Dragoner-Regiment Prinz Karl Nr. 22
  - Jäger-Regiment zu Pferde Nr. 5
- 29. Feldartillerie-Brigade:
  - 2. Badisches Feldartillerie-Regiment Nr. 30
  - 5. Badisches Feldartillerie-Regiment Nr. 76

== Order of battle on mobilization ==
On mobilization in August 1914 at the beginning of World War I, most divisional cavalry, including brigade headquarters, was withdrawn to form cavalry divisions or split up among divisions as reconnaissance units (the 29th Cavalry Brigade headquarters was dissolved and its two regiments divided among divisions). Divisions received engineer companies and other support units from their higher headquarters. The 29th Division was renamed the 29th Infantry Division. It kept all three infantry brigades and was thus much larger than most infantry divisions. Its initial wartime organization was as follows:

- 57. Infanterie-Brigade:
  - 5. Badisches Infanterie-Regiment Nr. 113
  - 6. Badisches Infanterie-Regiment Kaiser Friedrich III Nr. 114
- 58. Infanterie-Brigade:
  - 4. Badisches Infanterie-Regiment Prinz Wilhelm Nr. 112
  - 7. Badisches Infanterie-Regiment Nr. 142
- 84. Infanterie-Brigade:
  - 8. Badisches Infanterie-Regiment Nr. 169
  - 9. Badisches Infanterie-Regiment Nr. 170
- 3. Badisches Dragoner-Regiment Prinz Karl Nr. 22
- 29. Feldartillerie-Brigade:
  - 2. Badisches Feldartillerie-Regiment Nr. 30
  - 5. Badisches Feldartillerie-Regiment Nr. 76
- 1./Badisches Pionier-Bataillon Nr. 14

== Late World War I organization ==
Divisions underwent many changes during the war, with regiments moving from division to division, and some being destroyed and rebuilt. During the war, most divisions became triangular - one infantry brigade with three infantry regiments rather than two infantry brigades of two regiments (a "square division"). The 84th Infantry Brigade was detached to form the core of the 52nd Infantry Division in March 1915. The 57th Infantry Brigade headquarters and the 114th Infantry Regiment were detached to form the infantry base of the 212th Infantry Division in September 1916. An artillery commander replaced the artillery brigade headquarters, the cavalry was further reduced, the engineer contingent was increased, and a divisional signals command was created. The 29th Infantry Division's order of battle on 1 January 1918 was as follows:

- 58. Infanterie-Brigade:
  - 4. Badisches Infanterie-Regiment Prinz Wilhelm Nr. 112
  - 5. Badisches Infanterie-Regiment Nr. 113
  - 7. Badisches Infanterie-Regiment Nr. 142
- 4. Eskadron/Jäger-Regiment zu Pferde Nr. 5
- Artillerie-Kommandeur 67:
  - 2. Badisches Feldartillerie-Regiment Nr. 30
  - II. Bataillon/Reserve-Fußartillerie-Regiment Nr. 9 (from 15.VI.1918)
- Stab Pionier-Bataillon Nr. 130:
- 1./Badisches Pionier-Bataillon Nr. 14
- 5./Badisches Pionier-Bataillon Nr. 14
- Minenwerfer-Kompanie Nr. 29
- Divisions-Nachrichten-Kommandeur 29
