= Skirmish at Joncherey =

Franco-German border clash preceding World War I

- Part of the outbreak of World War I
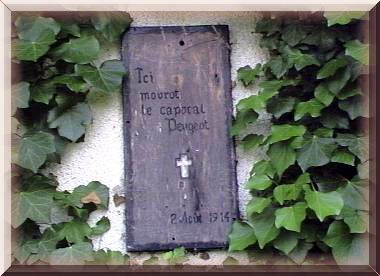
- Photograph of the memorial plaque commemorating Jules-André Peugeot, who was killed during the Skirmish at Joncherey on 2 August 1914.
Date	2 August 1914, 09:59
Location	Joncherey, French Third Republic 47°31′47″N 7°0′7″E
Result	French victory

Belligerents
France	Germany

Commanders and leaders
Jules-André Peugeot †	Albert Mayer †

Units involved
44th Infantry Regiment	5th Jäger Battalion

Strength
5	7

Casualties and losses
1 killed 1 wounded	1 killed 3 wounded (1 captured); 1 missing 2 escaped
- Location of Joncherey in France

The Skirmish at Joncherey (French pronunciation: [ʒɔ̃ʃʁɛ]) was a clash in the Territoire de Belfort, on the then border between France and Germany, and was the first military action of the Western Front of World War I. It occurred in the village of Joncherey near the French–German border in Alsace-Lorraine. The skirmish took place a day before the German declaration of war against France on 3 August 1914.

== Skirmish ==
At around 6:00 a.m. on 2 August 1914, Leutnant Albert Mayer and his small cavalry patrol illegally crossed the French border. They did not meet resistance, as the French had moved their troops back 10 km (6.2 mi) from the border, to avoid provoking the Germans and to show good faith in their attempts to avoid war. Twice that morning as the German party advanced further into France, they exchanged fire with small groups of French infantry. At 9:50 a.m., Mayer slashed with his sabre at (but did not injure) a French sentry, who was on lookout at the entrance to Joncherey. French Corporal Jules-André Peugeot and four other soldiers were at their billet, owned by a certain Louis Doucourt, eating breakfast at the time. Doucourt's daughter, Adrienne, came back inside from fetching water and reportedly said "The Prussians! The Prussians are coming!"

Around 10:00 a.m., Peugeot and his four comrades went to arrest the Germans. Upon meeting, Mayer fired three shots at Peugeot. One hit his shoulder, and Peugeot fired back as he was falling. Peugeot's comrades fired at the patrol with pistols. Mayer was shot in the stomach and seconds later was killed by a shot to the head. Peugeot stumbled back to the billet house where he died at 10:37 a.m. Three more German soldiers were injured; one fled to the woods, where he hid for a few days before being captured; one went missing; and two made their way back to Germany.
