= Karl von Hänisch =

Prussian general

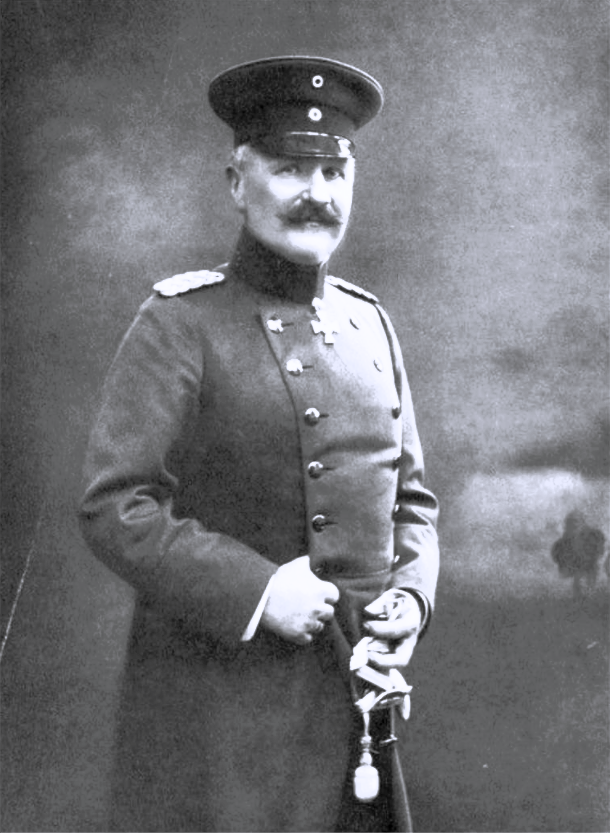
- Karl von Hänisch in c. 1916
- Born: Karl Heinrich von Hänisch; 25 April 1861; Unruhstadt, Province of Posen, Kingdom of Prussia, German Confederation
- Died: 27 March 1921 (aged 59); Blankenburg, Free State of Brunswick, German Reich
- Relatives: ∞ 1885 Elly Schroeder
- Military career
- Allegiance: Prussia; German Empire
- Branch: Prussian Army; Imperial German Army
- Service years: 1879–1918
- Rank: General der Infanterie
- Commands: Chief of Staff, 7th Army; XIV Corps
- Conflicts: World War I
- Awards: Iron Cross

Karl Heinrich Hänisch, as of 1871 von Hänisch (25 April 1861 – 27 March 1921), was a Prussian general who served in World War I. His military service spanned 39 years.

== Life ==
Karl Heinrich von Hänisch was a cadet in Oranienstein from 2 May 1873 and in Berlin from 1 May 1876. Because of his extraordinary achievements in the cadet corps, he was transferred to the Guard Grenadier Regiment No. 4 as a commissioned 2nd Lieutenant on 12 April 1879. In the later years he would serve as an adjutant, staff officer, company commander, battalion commander, regimental commander and brigade commander. On 27 January 1913, he was appointed Inspector General of Military Transport in Berlin as successor to Alfred von Lyncker.

During the First World War, he served as Chief of the General Staff of the 7th Army under Josias von Heeringen from 2 August 1914. On 10 March 1915, he was appointed Commanding General of the XIV. Army Corps. At that time, the corps was stationed in the Arras area and suffered heavy losses in the Battle of Loretto, which lasted from May to July 1915. Although some sectors in his area were lost, his troops succeeded in repelling the French breakthrough on the Loretto Heights and thwarting further attempts to break through. In 1916, von Hänisch and his corps were subordinated to the 3rd Army under General of the Cavalry Karl von Einem.

Due to illness, von Hänisch relinquished command to Lieutenant General Martin Chales de Beaulieu on 12 August 1916. He was subsequently transferred from the army to the officers' reserve corps. On 10 September 1916, he was granted the honorary rank of General of the Infantry with a pension and placed at disposal (z. D.). From 25 November 1916, von Hänisch was reinstated and served as Commanding General of the Deputy General Command of the X. Army Corps in Hanover. In this position, von Hänisch received his commission on 27 January 1918.

When the November Revolution that originated with the Kiel mutiny broke out, only two generals in Germany opposed it in person. In Lübeck, Lieutenant General Harry von Wright confronted the mutineers with his pistol, and in Hanover, von Hänisch did so with his drawn sword, attempting to maintain military discipline. Days after the Armistice of 11 November 1918, his mobilization order was rescinded on 17 November 1918 and he was finally able to retire.

== Family ==
Karl Heinrich von Hänisch was the son of Prussian General of the Cavalry Carl Eduard von Hänisch (1829–1908) and his wife Laura Adele Jeannette Kamilla, née von Hippel (1834–1918). He had eight siblings. His father had been elevated to hereditary Prussian nobility on 16 June 1871 for his extraordinary achievements in the Austro-Prussian War and the Franco-German War.

=== Marriage ===
On 1 July 1885 in Halberstadt, 2nd Lieutenant von Hänisch married his fiancée Elly Marianne Henriette Schroeder (1862–1931), daughter of the mining director Julius Schröder. They would have five children:

- Karl Julius Richard Eduard (16 April 1886 – 5 August 1877)
- Elisabeth Carlotta "Liselotte" (22 August 1888 – 21 July 1937): married to Uhlan Rittmeister Hans Würtz, last rank Colonel in WWII
- Hans Erich (26 August 1890 – 21 January 1915): Leutnant of the Dragoon Regiment No. 23
  - died from wounds received during the First Battle of the Marne
- Liddy Laura Hildegard (3 December 1894 – 4 November 1931): married to Paul Aladar Freiherr von Uckermann
  - Colonel Freiherr von Uckermann, Field Commandant 589 Orléans (Loiret), was † on 7 August 1944 at the Château de Solterre (Orléans) during an attempted kidnapping by the Résistance.
- Joachim Martin Friedrich (10 November 1897 – 12 December 1944): married Ilse Bauermeister from Hamburg, his daughter Dagmar is the grandmother of Luisa Neubauer.
  - During the First World War, he was a 2nd Lieutenant in the Life Guards Hussar Regiment and a recipient of the Iron Cross First Class. Later, residing in Tilsit, he was a factory director and chairman of the board of J. Brüning & Sohn AG.

== Promotions ==
- 12 April 1879 Sekondeleutnant (2nd Lieutenant)
- 14 June 1888 Premierleutnant (1st Lieutenant)
- 19 September 1891 Hauptmann (Captain)
- 18 October 1897 Major
- 24 April 1904 Oberstleutnant (Lieutenant Colonel)
- 27 January 1907 Oberst (Colonel)
- 27 January 1911 Generalmajor (Major General)
- 22 March 1913 Generalleutnant (Lieutenant General)
- 10 September 1916 Charakter als General der Infanterie (Honorary/Brevet General of the Infantry)
- 27 January 1918 General der Infanterie (General of the Infantry)

== Awards and decorations ==
- Friedrich Order, Knight's Cross First Class (WF3a)
- Prussian Centenary Medal 1897
- Red Eagle Order, 4th Class
- Baden Order of the Zähringer Lion, Knight's Cross 1st Class (BZL3a/BZ3a)
- Prussian Order of the Crown, 3rd Class
- Prussian Long Service Cross for 25 years (DA)
- Russian Order of Saint Anna, 2nd Class (RA2) in January 1905
- Red Eagle Order, 3rd Class with the Bow (mit der Schleife) on 21 January 1906
- Saxe-Ernestine House Order, Commander 2nd Class (HSEH2b/HSH2b) in February 1908
- Royal Crown to his Red Eagle Order 3rd Class with the Bow in October 1908
- Prussian Order of the Crown, 2nd Class on 1 June 1910
- Red Eagle Order, 2nd Class with Oak Leaves on 1 June 1912
- Saxe-Ernestine House Order, Grand Cross (SEH1/HSEH1/HSH1) in September 1913
- Bavarian Military Merit Order, II. Class with Star (BMV2mSt) in April 1914
- Iron Cross (1914), 1st and 2nd Class
- Württemberg Order of the Crown, Commander (Kommenthur) with Star (WK2a)
- Star and Swords to his Red Eagle Order 2nd Class with Oak Leaves on 12 August 1916
- Oldenburg Friedrich August Cross, 2nd and 1st Class (OFA1/OK1) in January 1917
- Cross of Merit for War Aid (VK) on 10 May 1917

== Works cited ==
- von Priesdorff, Kurt (1942). Soldatisches Führertum (in German). Vol. 10. Hamburg: Hanseatische Verlagsanstalt. pp. 84, 104–106.
- Neubauer, Luisa (2022). Gegen die Ohnmacht (in German). Tropen Verlag. p. 32. ISBN 9783608501988.
