= Battle of Großbeeren order of battle =

The Battle of Großbeeren was fought on 23 August 1813 between the Prussian III Corps under Friedrich Wilhelm Freiherr von Bülow and the Franco-Saxon VII Corps under Jean Reynier. This order of battle also includes other forces on both sides that were nearby but not directly engaged in the battle.

== Allied Army of the North ==
Commander: Crown Prince Charles John of Sweden (Bernadotte)

=== 3rd Prussian Army Corps ===
Commander: Generallieutenant Friedrich Wilhelm Freiherr von Bülow

- 3rd Brigade: Generalmajor Prince Ludwig von Hesse-Homburg
  - 2nd East Prussian Grenadier Battalion (20/1,004)
  - 1/,2/,Fus/3rd East Prussian Infantry Regiment (65/2,397)(includes 2 jäger dets)
  - 1/,2/,3/4th Reserve Infantry Regiment (49/2,127)
  - 8/,11/,12/,20/3rd East Prussian Landwehr Regiment
  - 1/,2/,3/,4/1st Leib Hussar Regiment (27/691)(+jägers)
  - 6pdr Foot Battery #5 "Glassenapp" (4/109)
- 4th Brigade: Generalmajor von Thümen
  - 1/,2/,Fus/4th East Prussian Infantry Regiment (68/2,481)
  - 1/,2/,3/,4/5th Reserve Infantry Regiment (56/2,825)
  - 1/,2/Elbe Infantry Regiment (34/1,686)
  - 2/,4/East Prussian Jäger Battalion (8/350)
  - 1/,2/,3/Pommeranian National Cavalry Regiment (14/361)
  - 6pdr Foot Battery #6 "Ludwig" (3/101)
- 5th Brigade: Generalmajor von Borstell
  - Pommeranian Grenadier Battalion (25/943)
  - 1/,2/,Fus/1st Pommeranian Infantry Regiment (68/2,622)
  - 1/,2/,3/2nd Reserve Infantry Regiment (41/2,150)
  - 2/,4/2nd Kurmärk Landwehr Regiment (29/710)
  - 1/,2/,3/,4/Pommeranian Hussar Regiment (29/710)(+jägers)
  - 1/,2/,3/,4/West Prussian Uhlan Regiment (16/575)
  - 6pdr Foot Battery #10 "Magenhofer" (3/111)
- 6th Brigade: Generalmajor von Krafft
  - 1/,2/,Fus/Colberg Infantry Regiment (68/2,627)(2 jäger detachments)
  - 1/,2/,3/9th Reserve Infantry Regiment (45/2,210)
  - 1/,2/,3/,4/1st Neumärk Landwehr Regiment (65/2,730)
  - 1/,2/,3/,4/1st Pommeranian Landwehr Cavalry Regiment (15/270)
  - 6pdr Foot Battery #16 "Spreuth" (4/119)
- Reserve Cavalry: Generalmajor von Oppen
  - 1/,2/,3/,4/Königin Dragoon Regiment (+jäger)(21/676)
  - 1/,2/,3/,4/Brandenburg Dragoon Regiment (+jäger)(22/613)
  - 1/,2/,3/,4/2nd West Prussian Dragoon Regiment (+jäger)(19/598)
  - 3/,4//2nd Silesian Hussar Regiment (14/430)
  - 1/,2/,3/,4/2nd Kurmärk Landwehr Cavalry Regiment (15/316)
  - 1/,3/,4/,5/4th Kurmärk Landwehr Cavalry Regiment (19/356)
  - Horse Battery #5 "Neindorff" (4/126)
  - Horse Battery #6 "Steinwehr" (4/128)
- Artillery Reserve: Oberstleutnant Holtzendorf
  - 12pdr Foot Batteries #4 "Meyer" & #5 "Condradi" (4/353)
  - 6pdr Foot Battery #19 "Baumgarten/Liebermann" (4/108)
  - 2 Russian 12pdr Batteries #7 "Dietrich/Zaweski" & #21 "Schluter" (18/500)
  - Prussian Feld Pioneer Companies #4 & #5 (3/152)

=== 4th Prussian Army Corps ===
Commander: Generallieutenant Bogislav Friedrich Emanuel von Tauentzien

- 1st Brigade: Generalmajor Dobschütz
  - 1/,2/,3/3rd Reserve Infantry Regiment (49/2,405)
  - 1/,2/1st Kurmärk Landwehr Regiment (37/1,426)
  - 1/,3/2nd Neumärk Landwehr Cavalry Regiment (8/164)
  - 1/,2/,3/,3rd East Prussian Landwehr Cavalry Regiment (15/295)
  - 1/2 6pdr Foot Battery #20 "Papendick" (2/52)
- 2nd Brigade: Oberst Graf Lindenau
  - 1/,2/,3/,4/5th Kurmärk Landwehr Regiment (86/2,790)
  - 1/,2/,3/,4/2nd Neumärk Landwehr Regiment (50/1,520)
  - 1/,2/,5/1st Silesian Landwehr Regiment (61/2,010)
  - 2/,6/Berlin Landwehr Cavalry Regiment (2)(8/176)
  - 1/,2/1st Kurmärk Landwehr Cavalry Regiment (9/136)
  - 1/,2/,3/,4/3rd Pommeranian Landwehr Cavalry Regiment (12/315)
  - 1/,2/7th Kurmärk Landwehr Cavalry Regiment (7/157)
  - 1/2 6pdr Foot Battery #30 "Hertig" (2/79)
- Artillery Reserve: Oberstleutnant von Strampf
  - 6pdr Foot Batteries #17 "Gleim" & #27 "Matthias" (4/157)
  - Horse Battery #11 "Borchard" (2/79)

=== Detached Corps ===
Commander: General von Wobeser

- 1/,2/,3/,4/1st West Prussian Landwehr Regiment (62/1,770)
- 1/,2/,3/2nd West Prussian Landwehr Regiment (68/1,860)
- 1/,2/,3/,4/3rd West Prussian Landwehr Regiment (64/1,950)
- 4/1st East Prussian Landwehr Regiment
- 1/,2/,3/1st West Prussian Landwehr Cavalry Regiment (10/198)
- 1/,2/,3/2nd West Prussian Landwehr Cavalry Regiment (9/168)
- 1/,2/3rd West Prussian Landwehr Cavalry Regiment (9/153)
- 6pdr Foot Battery #22 "Wegner" (3/122)

=== Detached Corps ===
Commander: General von Hirschfeldt

- 1/,2/,3/,4/1st Reserve Infantry Regiment (82/2,800)
- 1/,2/,3/,4/3rd Kurmärk Landwehr Regiment (80/1,860)
- 1/,2/,3/4th Kurmärk Landwehr Regiment (68/1,800)
- 1/,2/,3/,4/6th Kurmärk Landwehr Regiment (80/2,400)
- 1/,2/,3/7th Kurmärk Landwehr Regiment (68/1,800)
- 1/,2/,3/,4/3rd Kurmärk Landwehr Cavalry Regiment (14/320)
- 1/,2/,3/,4/5th Kurmärk Landwehr Cavalry Regiment (14/320)
- 1/,2/,3/,4/6th Kurmärk Landwehr Cavalry Regiment (14/320)
- Russian Light Battery #26 "Chamborand" (10 guns) (6/190)

== French Army of Berlin ==
Commander: Marshal Nicolas Oudinot

=== IV Corps ===
Commander: Général de division Henri Gatien Bertrand

- 15th (Italian) Division: Général de division Achille Fontanelli
  - Brigade: Général de brigade Philippe André Martel
    - 2/,3/,4/1st Italian Légère Regiment
    - 1/Milan Guard Regiment
    - Brigade: Général de brigade Saint Andrea
    - 3/,4/1st Italian Line Regiment
    - 2/,3/,4/4th Italian Line Regiment
  - Brigade: Général de brigade Ange-Pierre Moroni
    - 3/,4/6th Italian Line Regiment
    - 2/,3/,4/7th Italian Line Regiment
  - Artillery:
    - 1st Italian Foot Artillery (6×6pdrs & 2×24pdr howitzers)
    - 13th Italian Foot Artillery (6×6pdrs & 2×24pdr howitzers)
    - 5th Italian Artillery Train Company
    - 6th Italian Artillery Train Company
    - Det/6th (bis) Italian Artillery Train Company
- 12th Division: Général de division Charles Antoine Morand
  - Advanced Guard:
    - 2/8th Légère Regiment
    - 4/8th Légère Regiment
  - Brigade: Général de brigade Antoine Alexandre Julienne de Bélair
    - 1/,2/,3/,4/,6/3th Line Regiment
    - Regimental Artillery
  - Brigade: Général de brigade Étienne Hulot
    - 1/,2/,4/,6/23rd Line Regiment
    - Regimental Artillery
  - Artillery:
    - 1/2nd Foot Artillery (6×6pdrs & 2×24pdr howitzers)
    - 3/2nd Foot Artillery (6×6pdrs & 2×24pdr howitzers)
    - 1/7th (bis) Train Battalion
    - 2/7th (bis) Train Battalion
- 38th (Württemberg) Division: Generallieutenant Frederic von Franquemont
  - Brigade: Generalmajor Spitzemberg
    - 1/,2/1st Line Regiment "Prinz Paul"
    - 1/,2/2nd Line Regiment "Herzog Wilhelm"
  - Brigade: Generalmajor Doring
    - 1/,2/4th Line Regiment
    - 1/,2/6th Line Regiment
  - Brigade: Generalmajor Stockmeyer
    - 1/,2/7th Line Regiment
    - 1/9th Light Regiment
    - 1/10th Light Regiment
  - Artillery:
    - 1st Württemberg Heavy Battery (4×12pdrs & 2 Heavy Howitzers)
    - 1st Württemberg Light Battery (4×6pdrs & 2×7pdr Howitzers)
- 24th Light Cavalry Brigade: Général de brigade André Louis Elisabeth Marie Briche (Generalmajor Jett)
  - 1/,2/,3/,4/3rd Württemberg Chasseur Regiment "Herzog Ludwig"
  - 1/,2/,3/,4/1st Württemberg Chevauleger Regiment "Prinz Adam"
  - 1st Württemberg Horse Battery - "von Bürgi" (4×6pdrs & 2×7pdr howitzers)
- Park & Reserve:
  - 24/2nd Foot Artillery (6×12pdrs & 2×6" howitzers)
  - 26/2nd Foot Artillery (6×12pdrs & 2×6" howitzers)
  - 26/4th Foot Artillery (6×12pdrs & 2×6" howitzers)
  - 8/4th Horse Artillery (4×6pdrs & 2×24pdr howitzers)
  - 13th Artillery Ouvriers
  - 3/7th (bis) Artillery Train Battalion
  - 4/7th (bis) Artillery Train Battalion
  - 5/7th (bis) Artillery Train Battalion
  - 6/7th (bis) Artillery Train Battalion
  - 7/7th (bis) Artillery Train Battalion
  - 4/11th Principal Artillery Train Battalion
- Engineers:
  - 2/1st Sapper Battalion
  - 8/1st Sapper Battalion
  - 8/1st Italian Sapper Battalion
  - 3/Italian Marine Artisan Battalion
  - Engineering Train Squad
- Military Equippage:
  - 5/9th Military Equippage Battalion
  - 6/9th Military Equippage Battalion
  - 7/9th Military Equippage Battalion
  - Italian Transport

=== VII Corps ===
Commander: Général de division Jean Reynier

- 24th (Saxon) Division: Generallieutenant Le Coq
  - Brigade: Oberst von Brause
    - 1/,2/1st Light Infantry Regiment "LeCoq"
    - 1/Maximilian Infantry Regiment
    - 1st Jäger Company
    - 1/Guard Grenadier Regiment
    - 2/Von Rechten Regiment
  - Brigade: Oberst von Mellentin
    - Converged Grenadier Battalion "Spiegel"
    - 1/,2/Prinz Frederich August Infantry Regiment
    - 1/,2/von Steindel Infantry Regiment
  - Artillery: Major von Roth
    - 1st Saxon Foot Battery "Dietrich" (6×6pdrs & 2×8pdr howitzers)
    - 2nd Saxon Foot Battery "Zandt" (6×6pdrs & 2×8pdr howitzers)
    - Saxon Train Det.
- 25th (Saxon) Division: Generallieutenant von Sahr
  - Brigade: Oberst von Bose
    - Converged Grenadier Battalion "Sperl"
    - 1/,2/2nd Light Infantry Regiment "von Sahr"
    - 2/König Infantry Regiment
    - 1/Niesemenschel Infantry Regiment
  - Brigade: Oberst von Ryssel
    - 1/, 2/Prinz Anton Infantry Regiment
    - 1/,2/von Löw Infantry Regiment
  - Artillery: Major Gau
    - 3rd Saxon Foot Battery "Kühnel" (6×6pdrs & 2×8pdr howitzers)
    - 4th Saxon Foot Battery "Rouvroy II" (6×6pdrs & 2×8pdr howitzers)
    - Saxon Train Det.
- 32nd Division: Général de division Pierre François Joseph Durutte
  - Brigade: Général de brigade Étienne Anatole Gédéon Jarry
    - 1/36th Légère Regiment
    - Det/ 3/36th Légère Regiment
    - 4/36th Légère Regiment
    - 1/,3/,4/131st Infantry Regiment
  - Brigade:
    - Det/133rd Infantry Regiment
    - 3/,4/133rd Infantry Regiment
    - 2/,3/Würzburg Infantry Regiment
- 26th Light Cavalry Brigade: Generalmajor von Gablenz (Oberst Lindenau)
  - 1-8/Saxon Hussar Regiment
  - 1-5/Prinz Clemens Uhlan Regiment
  - 1st Saxon Horse Battery "Birnbaum" (4×6pdrs & 2×8pdr howitzers)
  - 2nd Saxon Horse Battery "Probsthayn" (4×6pdrs & 2×8pdr howitzers)
- Park & Reserves:
  - Saxon 12pdr Foot Battery "Rouvroy I" (6×12pdrs & 2×8pdr howitzers)
  - Saxon Sapper Company
  - Saxon Park
  - Saxon Train

=== XII Corps ===
Commander: Marshal Nicolas Oudinot

- 13th Division: Général de division Michel-Marie Pacthod
  - Brigade: Général de brigade Martial Bardet
    - 4/1st Légère Regiment
    - 3/,4/7th Infantry Regiment
    - 4/42nd Infantry Regiment
  - Brigade: Général de brigade Jean-Baptiste Cacault
    - 3/, 4/67th Infantry Regiment
    - 2/,3/,4/101st Infantry Regiment
  - Artillery:
    - 4/4th Foot Artillery (6×6pdrs & 2×24pdr howitzer)
    - 20/4th Foot Artillery (6×6pdrs & 2×24pdr howitzer)
    - 2/4th Principal Train Battalion
    - 3/7th (bis) Train Battalion
- 14th Division: Général de division Armand Charles Guilleminot
  - Brigade: Général de brigade Louis Bertrand Pierre Brun de Villeret
    - 2/,6/18th Légère Regiment
    - 1/,2/,3/156th Infantry Regiment
  - Brigade: Général de brigade Antoine Gruyer
    - 2/Illyrian Infantry Regiment (26/486)
    - 3/,4/52nd Infantry Regiment
    - 1/,2/,3/137th Infantry Regiment
    - Illyrian Chasseurs
  - Artillery:
    - 2/4th Foot Artillery (6×6pdrs & 2×24pdr howitzer)
    - 1/8th Foot Artillery (6×6pdrs & 2×24pdr howitzer)
    - 1/9th (bis) Train Battalion
    - 4/3rd (bis) Train Battalion
    - 1/4th Principal Train Battalion
    - 5/7th Principal Train Battalion
- 29th (Bavarian) Division: Generallieutenant Raglovitch
  - Brigade: Generalmajor Maillot de la Treill
    - 1st Bavarian Light Infantry Battalion
    - 2/3rd Bavarian Infantry Regiment
    - 1/13th Bavarian Infantry Regiment
    - 1/4th Bavarian Infantry Regiment
    - 2/8th Bavarian Infantry Regiment
  - Brigade: Generalmajor Wolf
    - 2nd Bavarian Light Infantry Battalion
    - 2/5th Bavarian Infantry Regiment
    - 2/7th Bavarian Infantry Regiment
    - 2/9th Bavarian Infantry Regiment
    - 2/10th Bavarian Infantry Regiment
  - Artillery:
    - 1st Bavarian Foot Artillery (6×6pdrs & 2×7pdr howitzers)
    - 2nd Bavarian Foot Artillery (6×6pdrs & 2×7pdr howitzers)
    - 1st Bavarian Reserve Artillery (6×12pdrs & 2×7pdr howitzers)
    - 1st Bavarian Train Battalion

=== III Cavalry Corps ===
Commander: Général de division Jean-Toussaint Arrighi de Casanova

- 5th Light Cavalry Division: Général de division Jean Thomas Guillaume Lorge
  - 12th Light Cavalry Brigade: Général de brigade Charles Claude Jacquinot
    - 3/,4/5th Chasseur à Cheval Regiment
    - 3/,4/10th Chasseur à Cheval Regiment
    - 5/,6/13th Chasseur à Cheval Regiment
  - 13th Light Cavalry Brigade: Général de brigade Antoine François Eugène Merlin
    - 4/15th Chasseur à Cheval Regiment
    - 3/21st Chasseur à Cheval Regiment
    - 3/,4/22nd Chasseur à Cheval Regiment
- 6th Light Cavalry Division: Général de division François Fournier-Sarlovèze
  - 14th Light Cavalry Brigade: Général de brigade Pierre Mourier
    - 4/29th Chasseur à Cheval Regiment
    - 4/31st Chasseur à Cheval Regiment
    - 4/1st Hussar Regiment
  - 15th Light Cavalry Brigade: Général de brigade Auguste Jean Ameil
    - 3/,4/2nd Hussar Regiment
    - 5/4th Hussar Regiment
    - 4/12th Hussar Regiment
- 4th Heavy Cavalry Division: Général de division Jean-Marie Defrance
  - 1st Brigade: Général de brigade Jacques Philippe Avice
    - 4/4th Dragoon Regiment
    - 3/5th Dragoon Regiment
    - 3/12th Dragoon Regiment
    - 3/14th Dragoon Regiment
    - 4/24th Dragoon Regiment
  - 2nd Brigade: Général de brigade Jean Charles Quinette de Cernay
    - 4/16th Dragoon Regiment
    - 3/17th Dragoon Regiment
    - 3/21st Dragoon Regiment
    - 4/26th Dragoon Regiment
    - 5/27th Dragoon Regiment
    - 5/13th Cuirassier Regiment
- Artillery
  - 1/5th Horse Artillery (4×6pdrs & 2×7pdr howitzers)
  - 5/5th Horse Artillery (4×6pdrs & 2×7pdr howitzers)
  - 2/1st Horse Artillery (4×6pdrs & 2×7pdr howitzers)
  - 4/6th Horse Artillery (4×6pdrs & 2×7pdr howitzers)
  - Det. 5/1st (bis) Artillery Train
  - Det. 5/4th Principal Artillery Train

== Sources ==
- Nafziger, George. "Order of Battle for Gross-Beeren, 23 August 1813" (PDF). Napoleon Series.
- Six, Georges (1934). Dictionnaire biographique des généraux et amiraux français de la Révolution et de l'Empire: 1792-1814 (in French). Paris: Libraire Historique et Nobilaire. full text online: Tome I (A–J) Tome II (K–Z)
- Smith, Digby (1998). The Greenhill Napoleonic wars data book. London: Greenhill Books. pp. 440–441. ISBN 1-85367-276-9.
