= Reginald Statham =

English professor of gynecology

Reginald Statham

Reginald Samuel Sherard Statham OBE (11 March 1884 – 1959) was professor of gynaecology at the University of Bristol.

He attended Bradfield College, and earned his medical degree (M.D. M.Ch.) from the University of Bristol. He served with the Royal Army Medical Corps during World War I at the Battle of Mons and the First Battle of Ypres, among other assignments, and achieved the rank of major. He was also twice mentioned in despatches. After the war he was appointed OBE for his military service.

He married Annie Maitland Sherwin; they had two children.
