= 8th (1st Brandenburg) Life Grenadiers "King Frederick William III" =

- Leib-Grenadier-Regiment „König Friedrich Wilhelm III.“ (1. Brandenburgisches) Nr. 8
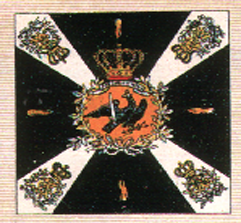
- The Leib-Grenadier-Regiment's regimental flag
- Active: 1808 – 1918
- Disbanded: 29 December 1918
- Country: Prussia
- Branch: Prussian Army
- Type: Infantry
- Patron: Frederick William III
- Engagements: War of the Sixth Coalition: Battle of Lützen; Battle of Bautzen; Battle of Paris (1814); Second Schleswig War: Battle of Dybbøl; Austro-Prussian War: Battle of Gitschin; Battle of Königgrätz; Franco-Prussian War: Battle of Gravelotte; Battle of Bellevue; Siege of Metz

Commanders
- Notable commanders: Heinrich Wilhelm von Horn (first); Wilhelm von Gluszewski (last)

The 8th (1st Brandenburg) Life Grenadiers "King Frederick William III" (German: Leib-Grenadier-Regiment "König Friedrich Wilhelm III." (1. Brandenburgisches) Nr. 8) was an infantry unit of the Prussian Army.

== History ==
The regiment was formed following the end of the Siege of Kolberg. Two infantry regiments were formed from the Prussian soldiers at Kolberg, which included this regiment as well as the Colberg Infantry Regiment.

=== War of the Sixth Coalition ===
The unit took part during the Battle of Lützen and the Battle of Bautzen, and later at the Battle of Paris.

=== Franco-Prussian War ===
On 16 July 1870, the unit received orders from divisional command for mobilization. By 21 July, all reserve officers and replacement personnel had arrived. The unit began to move to the frontlines on 23 July, traveling by rail via Berlin, Magdeburg, Brunswick, Minden, Cologne, and Bingen to Kreuznach. From 28 July, the unit joined forces with the 5th Division. By 6 August, the unit had reached the area around Neunkirchen. On the same day, the unit saw its combat at the Battle of Spicheren.

=== First World War ===
The regiment mobilized on 2 August 1914, and saw its first combat action at Tirlemont. Following the Battle of Mons, the unit advanced into France, where it fought at the First Battle of the Marne. On 4 April 1915, its command structure changed, and the unit was subordinate to the 15th Infantry Brigade for the rest of the war, and saw action at the Battle of Verdun.

The unit was transferred to the Eastern front in July 1917, and subsequently participated in a breakthrough in Eastern Galicia. In September, the unit was once again transferred to the Italian Front, where it participated in combat at the Battle of Caporetto. At Caporetto, the unit's commander, Lieutenant Colonel von Gluszewski, decided to attack key Italian positions at Monte Hum. In the subsequent capture, the regiment was able to seize multiple artillery pieces and machine guns. Additionally, around 3,500 men were taken prisoner. The unit later captured Monte San Giovanni, Monte Spinh, and Castel de Monte, and took another 4,000 Italian prisoners of war.

In December 1917, the unit was transferred back to the Western Front and deployed in the Champagne sector. The unit later participated in the German Spring Offensive of 1918. Following the Armistice of Compiègne, the remnants of the regiment returned to their garrison at Frankfurt am Oder and demobilized.
