= Oskar Niemeyer =

German soldier

Coordinates: 50°25′56″N 4°0′38″E

- Died: 1914; Nimy, Belgium
- Burial place: St Symphorien Military Cemetery
- Military career
- Allegiance: German Empire
- Service years: 1913–1914
- Rank: Musketier
- Unit: 84th Infantry Regiment
- Conflicts: Battle of Mons

Musketier Oskar Niemeyer (n.d. – 23 August 1914) was a German soldier. He is recognized as the first recipient (posthumous) of the Iron Cross during the First World War.

== Biography ==
Niemeyer was from Hildesheim. He joined the 84th Infantry Regiment as a recruit in the autumn of 1913, having previously been a gardener. On 23 August 1914, during the Battle of Mons, the 84th Infantry Regiment came upon resistance and closed swing bridge Mons–Condé canal while seeking to extend their position into the east side of the canal. Niemeyer swam across the canal, returned across the canal with a requisitioned small boat, paddled back across the canal with a team who took up position in a house and managed to open fire on the British from there. Meanwhile, Niemeyer opened the bridge allowing the Germans troops to cross in greater numbers. He was killed shortly after opening the bridge. Niemeyer is buried in St Symphorien Military Cemetery in Plot G1 row R grave 6.
