= Jean Houzeau de Lehaie =

Belgian biologist and horticulturist (1867-1959)

Jean Houzeau de Lehaie in 1950

Jean Auguste Hippolyte Houzeau de Lehaie (6 March 1867 - 4 September 1959) was a Belgian biologist and horticulturist who devoted his career to the botany of bamboo species and the introduction of many into European gardening practice through his property, L'Hermitage, near Mons in the Belgian province of Hainaut. He was also a student of the temperate terrestrial orchids of Belgium and France.

An inveterate traveler, he was the patron and editor of a journal devoted to bamboo, Le Bambou, which he published in 1906 to 1908. Over many decades he freely disseminated exotic bamboos to public and private gardens, testing them for hardiness in northern Europe.

His archaeological interests were stimulated by the Neolithic flint mines of Spiennes, near Mons. From 1945 to 1947 he edited and published the journal La Solidarité paysanne, defending the plight of the traditional modern European farmer.

== Gift of land ==
Rather than sell his land for a cemetery for German soldiers after the First World War, Houzeau de Lehaie donated the land for the St Symphorien Commonwealth War Graves Commission cemetery on the condition that it receive, amicably in death, German and Commonwealth graves.
