= St Symphorien Military Cemetery =

Commonwealth War Graves Commission cemetery

Coordinates: 50°25′56″N 4°0′38″E

- Commonwealth War Graves Commission
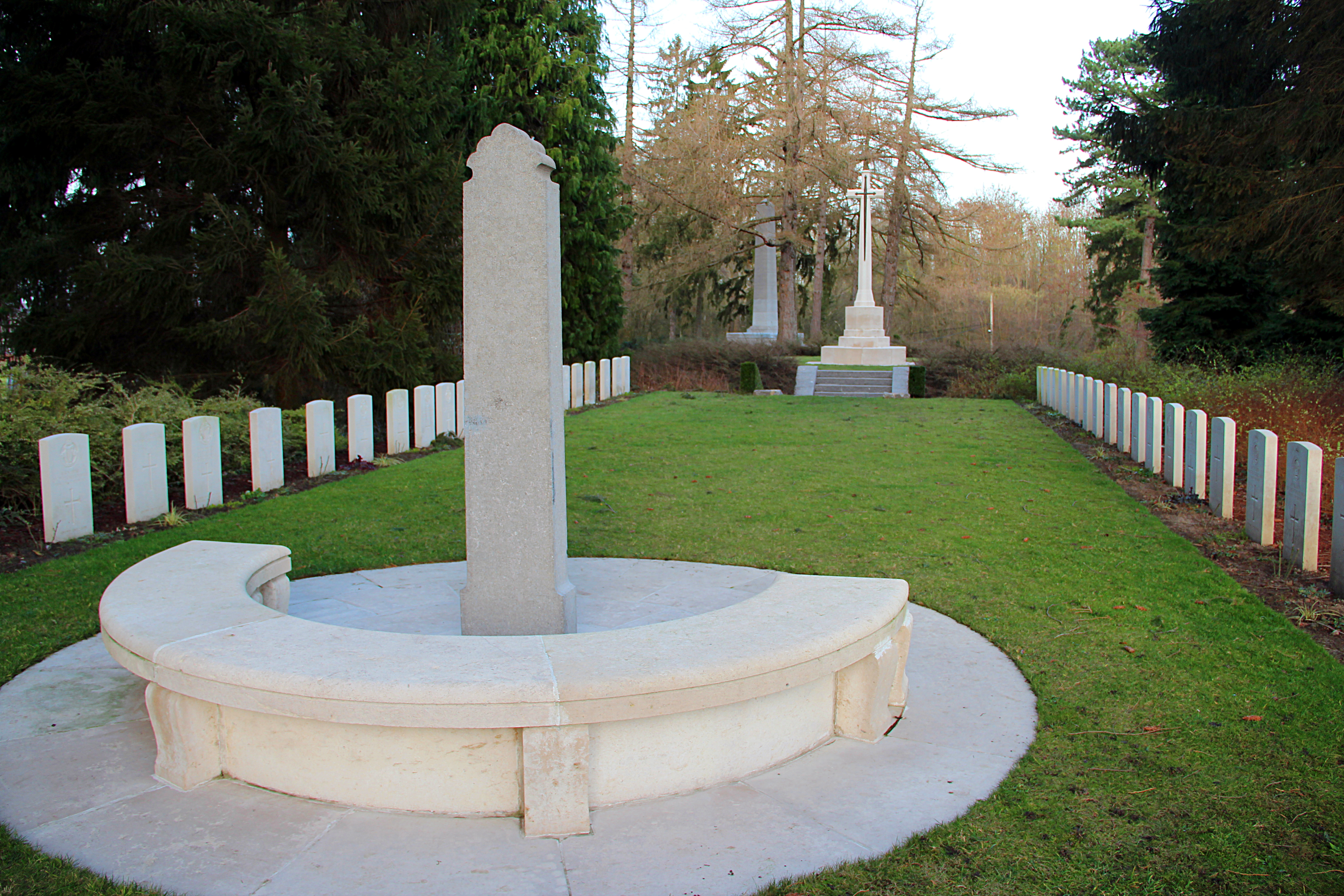
- Military Cemetery (British Commonwealth and German) and British memorial of Saint-Symphorien
- Used for those deceased World War I
- Established: 1916
- Location: near Saint-Symphorien, Belgium
- Designed by: Captain Bäumer (original); William Harrison Cowlishaw (redesign)
- Total burials: 513
- Unknowns: 105 (40 German, 65 Commonwealth)

Burials by nation
- Germany: 284; United Kingdom: 227; Canada: 2

Burials by war
- World War I: 513

UNESCO World Heritage Site
- Official name: Funerary and memory sites of the First World War (Western Front)
- Type: Cultural
- Criteria: i, ii, vi
- Designated: 2023 (45th session)
- Reference no.: 1567-WA08

The St Symphorien Military Cemetery is a First World War Commonwealth War Graves Commission burial ground in Saint-Symphorien, Belgium. It contains the graves of 284 German and 229 Commonwealth soldiers, principally those killed during the Battle of Mons. The cemetery was established by the German Army on land donated by Jean Houzeau de Lehaie. It was initially designed as a woodland cemetery before being redesigned by William Harrison Cowlishaw after the Imperial War Graves Commission took over maintenance of the cemetery after the war.

Notable Commonwealth burials in the cemetery include John Parr and George Lawrence Price, traditionally believed to be the first and last Commonwealth soldiers killed in action during the First World War, and Maurice Dease, the first posthumous recipient of the Victoria Cross of World War I. Notable German burials include Oskar Niemeyer, the first Iron Cross recipient of World War I.

== History ==
=== Battle of Mons ===
The Battle of Mons took place as part of the Battle of the Frontiers, in which the advancing German armies clashed with the advancing Allied armies along the Franco-Belgian and Franco-German borders. The British position on the French flank meant that it stood in the path of the German 1st Army. The British reached Mons on 22 August 1914 and at the time, the French Fifth Army, located on the right of the British, was heavily engaged with the German 2nd and 3rd armies at the Battle of Charleroi. The British agreed to hold the line of the Condé–Mons–Charleroi Canal for twenty-four hours, to prevent the advancing German 1st Army from threatening the French left flank. The British thus spent the day digging in along the canal.

At dawn on 23 August a German artillery bombardment began on the British lines; throughout the day the Germans concentrated on the British at the salient formed by the loop in the canal. At 9:00 a.m., the first German infantry assault began, with the Germans attempting to force their way across four bridges that crossed the canal at the salient. The initial German attack was repulsed with heavy losses but after the Germans switched to an open formation their advance progress more quickly as the looser formation made it more difficult for the British to inflict casualties rapidly. By the afternoon the British position in the salient had become untenable and by 3:00 p.m. the British began retreating to a new defensive line.

=== Establishment ===
Most of the British and German dead from the Battle of Mons were initially buried in church and local cemeteries in Mons and surrounding villages rather than a purpose built military cemetery. Subsequently, the German Army decided to exhume and re-inter the dead in a single location, as they determined the care and maintenance of isolated graves was unsustainable over the long term.

In spring 1916, a German officer by the name of Captain Roemer was searching for an appropriate piece of cemetery land south-east of Mons. During this search he approached renowned biologist and local landowner Jean Houzeau de Lehaie, who offered some former quarry land on his family estate lands between the districts of St. Symphorien and Spienne, possibly to ensure that land associated with Neolithic flint mines of Spiennes was not employed instead. Roemer initially proposed that the land be requisitioned, with compensation being provided by the local authorities. Houzeau de Lehaie refused to accept payment for the land and agreed to part with it only under the condition that it be donated instead of requisitioned, and that in the cemetery the dead of both sides be treated with equal respect. During 1916 and 1917 Landsturm Infantry Battalions exhumed burials from isolated and less maintainable sites and re-interred them in the new cemetery. Most of the bodies that were exhumed were from the north and north east of the Mons battlefield especially near Nimy and Obourg where the British stopped Imperial German units from crossing the Mons-Conde canal. The German and British dead were reburied in graves with markers containing the message Enemies in Life but United in Death (German: Im Leben ein Feind, im Tode vereint), a common German practice during the First World War. The cemetery was inaugurated on 6 September 1917 with a ceremony attended by prominent German figures, including Rupprecht, Crown Prince of Bavaria, Albrecht, Duke of Württemberg, and Frederick Francis IV, Grand Duke of Mecklenburg-Schwerin.

The cemetery contained 245 German and 188 British graves at the end of the war. This number increased in the post-war period, as both British and German remains from numerous isolated burial locations were concentrated to St. Symphorien until the cemetery reached its current number of 284 German soldiers and 229 Commonwealth soldiers. (Note: The additional German graves were mostly the result of graves being moved from Gembloux, Havre Noirchain, Obourg, Spiennes, St. Symphorien-parish cemetery, St. Symphorien municipal cemetery, and Wasmes-en-Borinage. British dead were gathered from Gembloux Communal Cemetery (where 22 British soldiers were buried in 1918–1919), Havre Old Communal Cemetery, Norchain Churchyard, Obourg Churchyard, Spiennes Communal Cemetery, St Symphorien Churchyard, St Symphorien Communal Cemetery, and Wasmes-en-Borinage Communal Cemetery.) Most of the identified German dead in the cemetery died in 1914 and were from units of IX Corps, which originated from the north of Germany from towns like Kiel, Hamburg and Bremen, and in Schleswig-Holstein.

=== Post-war ===
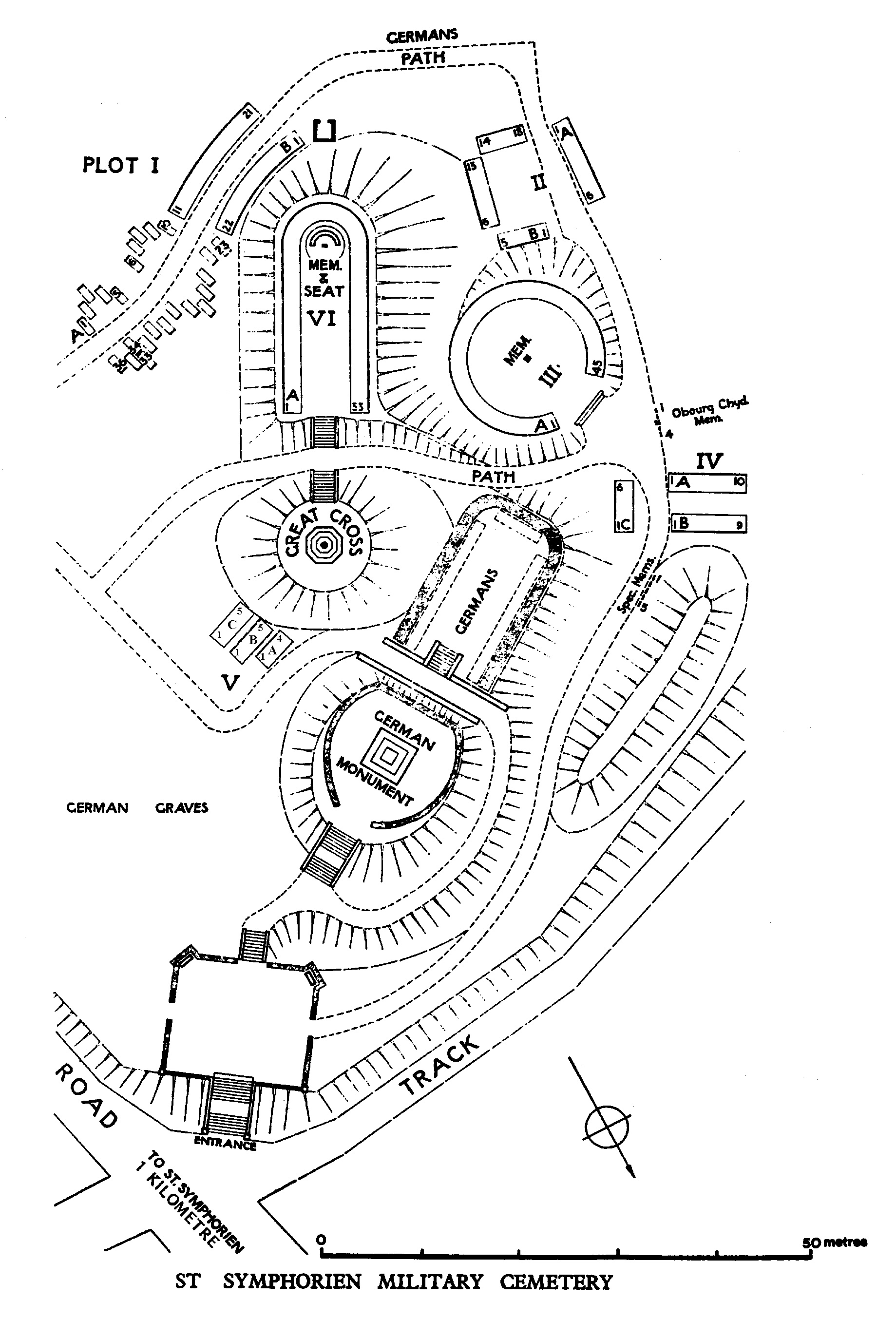
Map showing the lay-out following the redesign by William Harrison Cowlishaw

At the end of the war in November 1918, the maintenance of Commonwealth graves passed to Imperial War Graves Commission (now the Commonwealth War Graves Commission). From June 1921, the Belgian War Graves Commission appointed a supervisor to maintain the German graves as the Germans could not do so themselves on account of the terms of the Treaty of Versailles. In 1926, Belgium and Germany reached an agreement for the gradual transfer of maintenance responsibility to the Official German Burial Service in Belgium (German: Amtlicher Deutscher Gräberdienst in Belgien) representative at the embassy to Germany in Brussels. The Germans officially referred to the cemetery as Ehrenfriedhof Saint-Symphorien-Spiennes. Number 191. The name recognized that the cemetery was both located in close proximity to the town of Saint-Symphorien and technically located in the administrative areas of Spiennes while concurrently incorporating the number assigned to the cemetery in a Belgian ordered list of German cemeteries.

On 13 October 1930, representatives of the Official German Burial Service in Belgium, the Belgian War Graves Commission and the Imperial War Graves Commission met in Brussels to discuss the status of mixed British-German cemeteries in Belgium. In particular, they met to discuss the status of cemeteries established by Germans during the war where the majority of those buried in the cemetery were German. This meeting was brought about because the Imperial War Graves Commission had begun altering the layout of cemeteries containing a high percentage concentration of German dead and began replacing the existing headstones on the Commonwealth graves with the standardized Imperial War Graves Commission headstones, all without first consulting with the German Burial Service in Belgium. The German delegation hoped to retain the established design character of the cemeteries but were ultimately unsuccessful. Control for the cemetery was immediately passed to the Imperial War Graves Commission and further German contribution was limited to providing headstones for a number of graves that were lacking markers. Now that the Imperial War Graves Commission was in full control of the cemetery they immediately set about redesigning it, assigning the task to Assistant Architect William Harrison Cowlishaw. In 1933 Fritz Schult, Chief of the Official German Burial Service in Belgium, wrote to the Ministry of Foreign Affairs in Berlin to request that the Imperial War Graves Commission be approached to take control over other split British-German cemeteries such as those at Marcinelle New Communal Cemetery and Hautrage Military Cemetery. The Imperial War Graves Commission was maintaining the German graves at St. Symphorien at no cost to Germany and Schult believed it favorable to transfer management of other cemeteries if the Imperial War Graves Commission would assume all maintenance costs for those cemeteries as well.

=== Modern ===
On 4 August 2014, a ceremony was held at the cemetery to mark the 100th anniversary of the British and Belgian declaration of war following the German invasion of Belgium. It was attended by many important dignitaries including: King Philippe and Queen Mathilde of The Belgians, Prince William, Catherine, Duchess of Cambridge and Prince Harry as representatives of Queen Elizabeth II of the United Kingdom and Head of the Commonwealth, Joachim Gauck President of Germany, Michael D. Higgins President of the Republic of Ireland, Prime Minister of Belgium Elio Di Rupo and Prime Minister of the United Kingdom David Cameron.

== Design ==
=== Original design ===
Captain Bäumer designed the cemetery, assisted by militia-private Pieper. They developed a site plan based on the concept of Cemetery Reform (German: Friedhofsreform), which was popular in Germany at the time. In the cemetery design, particular attention was paid to ensuring simplicity with uniformity in each plot, all within a calming, arboreal environment consistent with a woodland cemetery (German: Waldfriedhof) style. Thirteen plots were marked off and young trees – and later extra conifers – were planted between the plots to ensure their visual and physical separation. The cemetery land itself had many artificial created differences in elevation due to the site being used as a dumping location for surplus soil associated with phosphate mining in the area. The cemetery plants were donated by the city of Bielefeld.

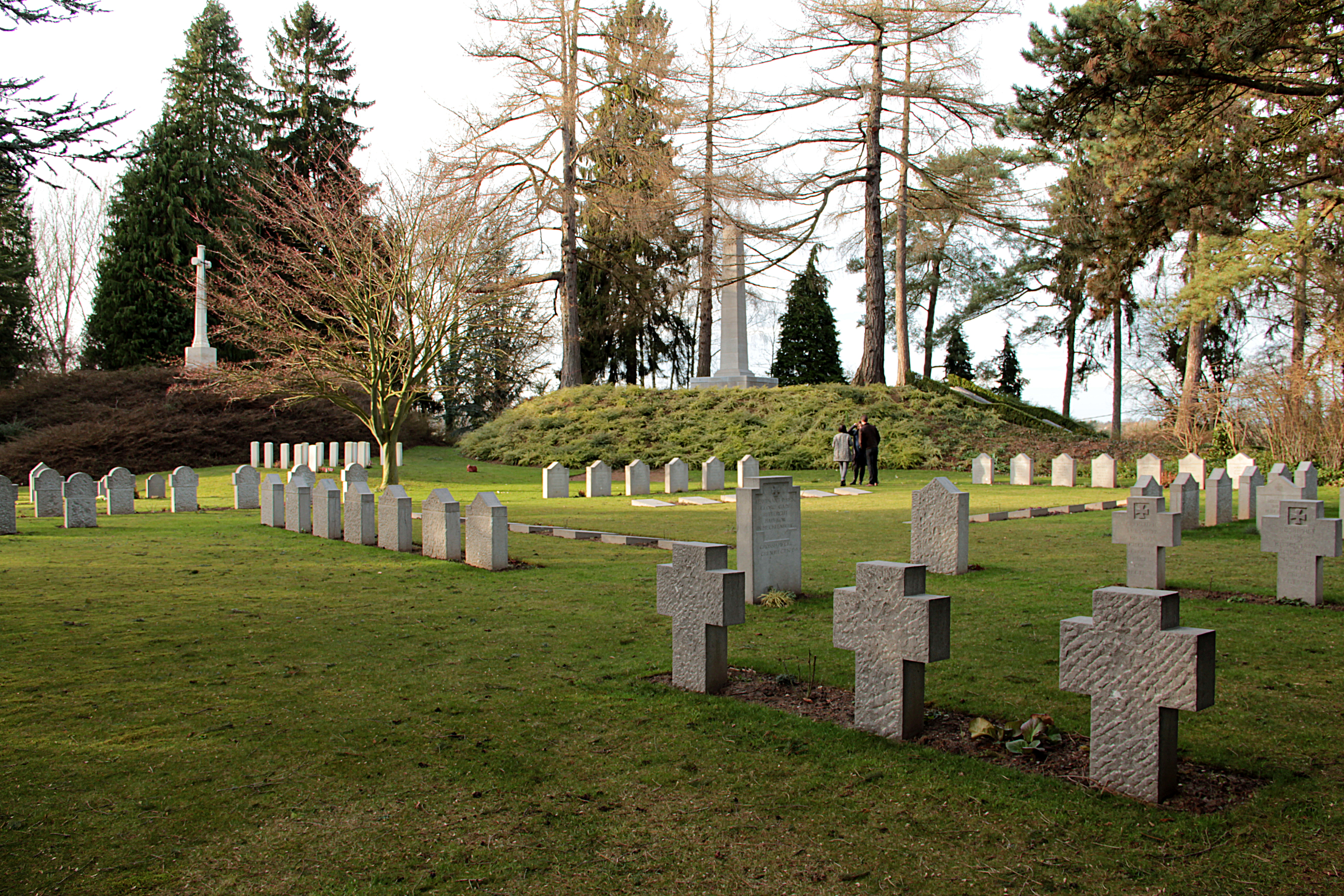
The forestry and German burial groupings with different headstones are remnants of the original cemetery design.

The German graves were grouped according to military unit. Every grave in each grouping receiving a similar headstone, but not necessarily the same as that in other groupings. There were a number of organizations in Germany that were particularly opposed to mass-produced identical headstones and by consequence the cemetery contains a number of differently styled headstones. The German headstones were carved from locally quarried stone, principally bluestone and Belgian Petit Granit. German officers were offered larger headstones to illustrate their higher military rank. The cemetery contains a number of German regimental memorials within the cemetery which were paid and provided by the city or town where the regiment was based.

The Germans treated the British dead in a similar manner to their own. All of the British were buried in individual plots and, like the Germans, grouped by unit as far as possible. The deceased British officers were buried in a plot separate from their troops and it is not known how these graves were marked before they were provided with the standardized Imperial War Grave Commission headstone. The Germans also erected simple regimental memorials that identified the unit or regiment within a number of the British groupings. This included one to the Middlesex Regiment which was mistakenly referred to as the "Royal Middlesex Regiment" although that was not its name at the time.

A classical 7 metres (23 ft) high obelisk memorial made of bluestone was placed near the entrance at the highest point in the cemetery. The monumental inscription on the obelisk is written in German and is dedicated to the German and British soldiers that died during the Battle of Mons: "In memory of the German and English soldiers who fell in the actions near Mons on the 23rd and 24th August 1914." (German: Zum Gedächtnis der am 23. und 24. August 1914 in den Kämpfen bei Mons gefallenen deutschen und englischen Soldaten). Near the cemetery entrance, a tablet in Latin was set out to explain the land was gifted for the purpose of a cemetery by Jean Houzeau de Lehaie.

=== Cowlishaw redesign ===
Full control of the St Symphorien cemetery was transferred to the Imperial War Graves Commission in 1930 after which William Harrison Cowlishaw set about redesigning the cemetery. The main change was the conversion from a woodland cemetery to the more open English garden style cemetery present at most Imperial War Graves Commission cemeteries. Many of the trees were chopped down, particularity those in the predominantly British south-eastern side, and grass sown in this area. The cemetery was made to feel more open but no changes were made to the location of the graves, effectively leaving each plot layout in situ choosing instead to remove vegetation that provided the visual compartmentalization to each plot. The predominantly German north-eastern half was left more characteristically in a woodland cemetery style, although many trees were pruned to ensure that an open view was created between the various plots. The original German headstones were retained and several German headstones added due to transferred graves from other sites. The other principal change was earthwork to create a raised hill where the Cross of Sacrifice would be erected. The German general monument was in no way modified but Cowlishaw likely created the hill to ensure the Cross of Sacrifice was not dwarfed by the German monument. Special memorials were erected to five soldiers of the Royal Irish Regiment believed to be buried in unnamed graves. Other special memorials record the names of four British soldiers, buried by the Germans in Obourg Churchyard, whose graves could not be found. Approximately 100 Commonwealth soldiers buried at St Symphorien were unidentified. They are interred under a headstone with a quote by Rudyard Kipling: "A Soldier of the Great War, Known Unto God."

== Notable graves ==
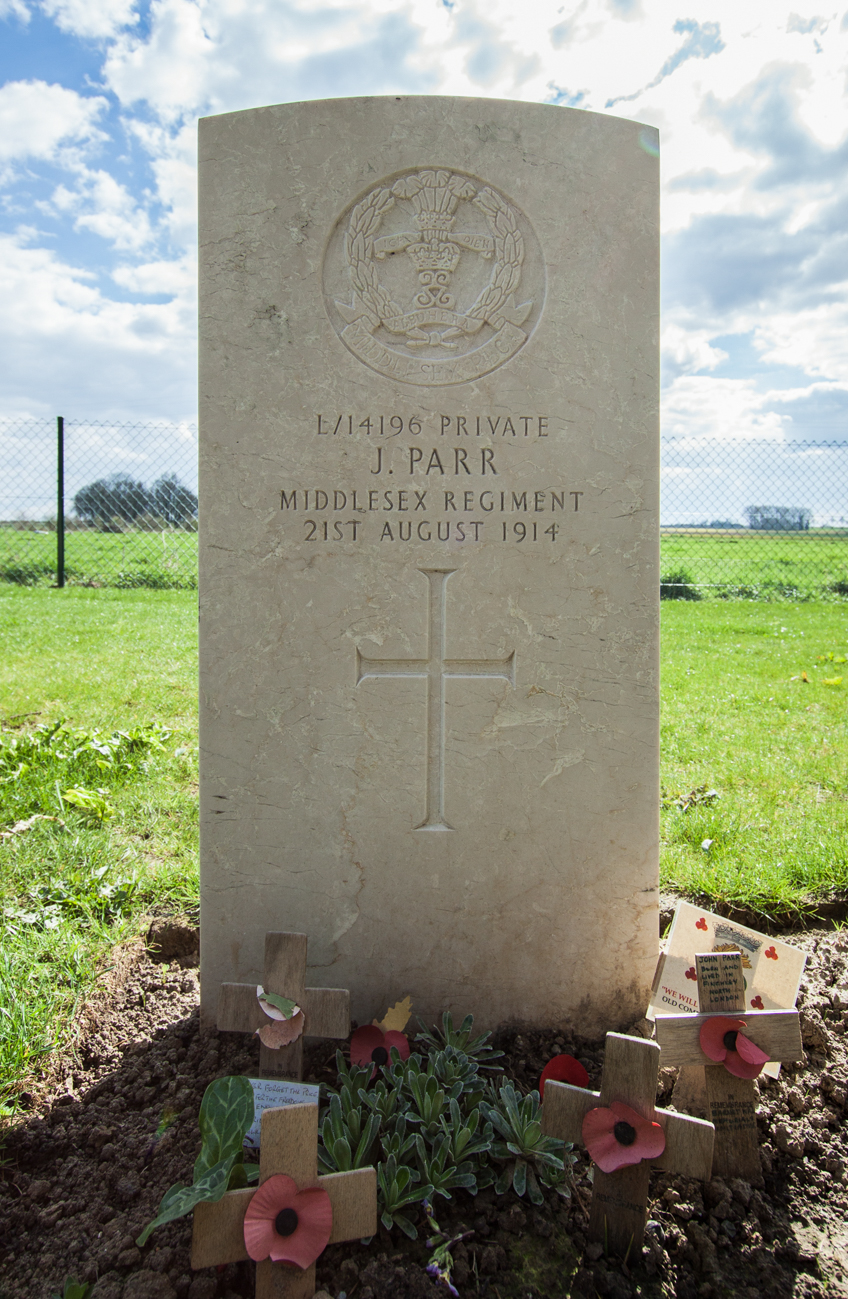
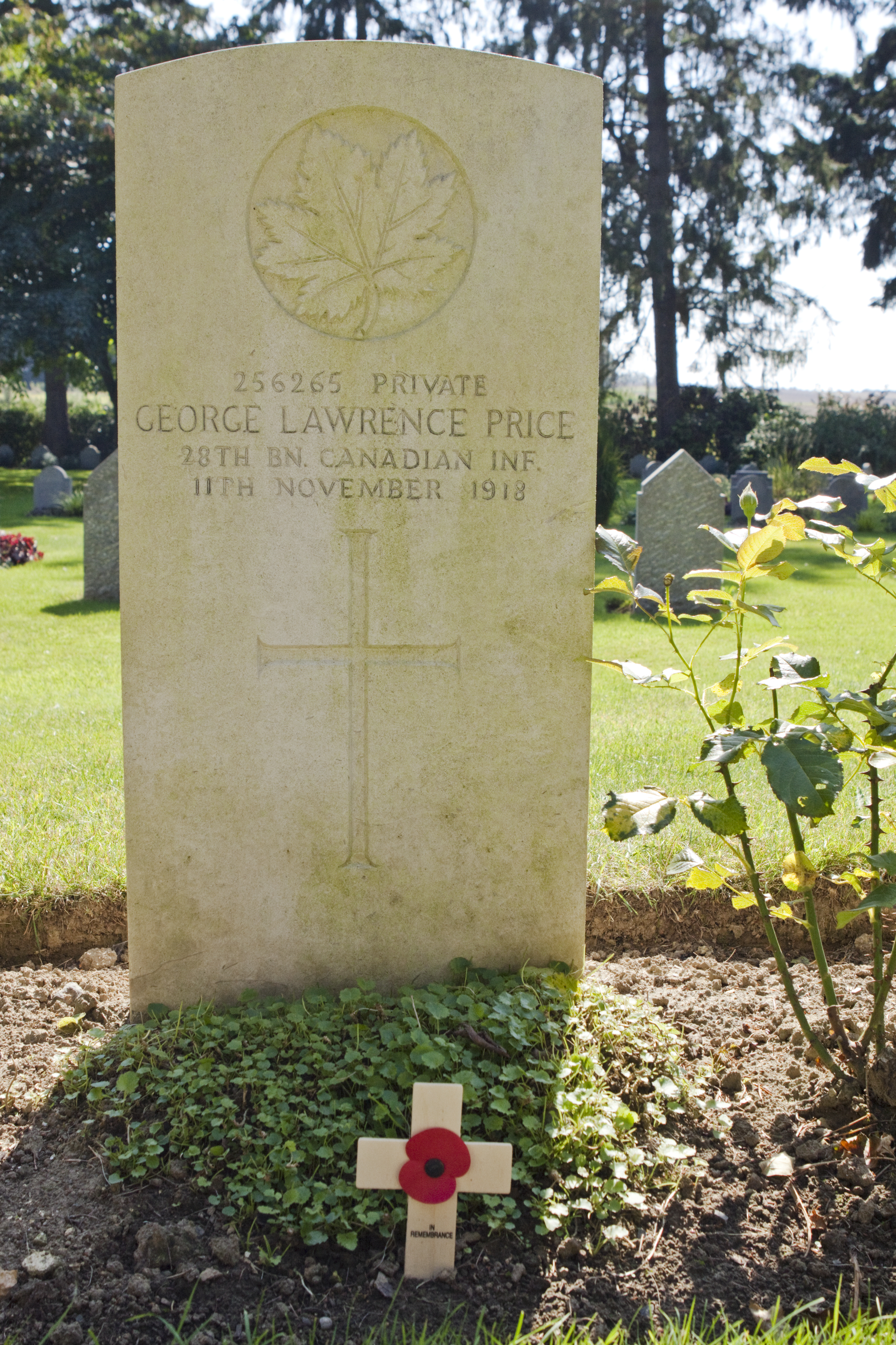
John Parr (left) and George Price (right), the first and last Commonwealth soldier killed in combat

Notable German burials include Musketier Oskar Niemeyer from the 84th Infantry Regiment who was the first recipient of the Iron Cross during the war. Having come to a crossing of the Mons–Condé canal with a closed swing bridge he swam across the canal, returned across the canal with a requisitioned small boat, paddled back across the canal with a team and then opened the bridge allowing the Germans troops to cross in greater numbers. He was killed shortly after opening the bridge.

Notable Commonwealth burials in the cemetery include Private John Parr, of the 4th Battalion, Middlesex Regiment and George Lawrence Price of the Canadian 28th (Northwest) Battalion each believed to be the respective first and last Commonwealth soldiers killed in action during the First World War, as also (for 1918) is George Ellison. Also buried in the cemetery is Maurice Dease who was the first posthumous recipient of the Victoria Cross in the war. Dease was awarded the Victoria Cross for defending Nimy Bridge and maintained firing of a machine gun until he was hit for a fifth and final time.

== Bibliography ==
- Commonwealth War Graves Commission News (August 4, 2014). "Unique Act of Commemoration to mark First World War Centenary at CWGC St. Symphorien Military Cemetery, Belgium". Commonwealth War Graves Commission.
- Commonwealth War Graves Commission (21 August 2014). "Virtual Tour of St. Symphorien Military Cemetery". Commonwealth War Graves Commission.
- Ben Djaffar, Lamya; De Smet, Isabelle, eds. (2015). Mons & Cœur du Hainaut: Guide d'architecture moderne et contemporaine 1885–2015 (in French). Paris: Cellule Architecture de la Fédération Wallonie-Bruxelles. OCLC 908443584.
- Hamilton, E. (1916). The First Seven Divisions: Being a Detailed Account of the Fighting from Mons to Ypres. London: Hurst and Blackett. OCLC 3579926.
- Gibson, Edwin; Ward, G. Kingsley (1989). Courage remembered: the story behind the construction and maintenance of the Commonwealth's military cemeteries and memorials of the wars of 1914–1918 and 1939–1945. Toronto: McClelland and Stewart. OCLC 659554725.
- Gordon, George (1917). The Retreat from Mons. London: Houghton Mifflin. OCLC 1893352.
- Mosse, George (1991). Fallen Soldiers: Reshaping the Memory of the World Wars. New York: Oxford University Press. OCLC 20012821.
- Zuber, T. (2011). The Real German War Plan 1904–14. Stroud: The History Press. ISBN 978-0-7524-5664-5.
