= HMS Mons =

There have been two ships of the Royal Navy named HMS Mons after the Battle of Mons:

- HMS Mons (1915) was an Admiralty M-class destroyer launched in 1915 and sold in 1921.
- HMS Mons (1945) was a Battle-class destroyer laid down in 1945 and cancelled.
