= Saint-Symphorien, Belgium =

Sub-municipality of the city of Mons, Belgium

Saint-Symphorien Sint-Symforyin (Walloon)
- Sub-municipality of Mons
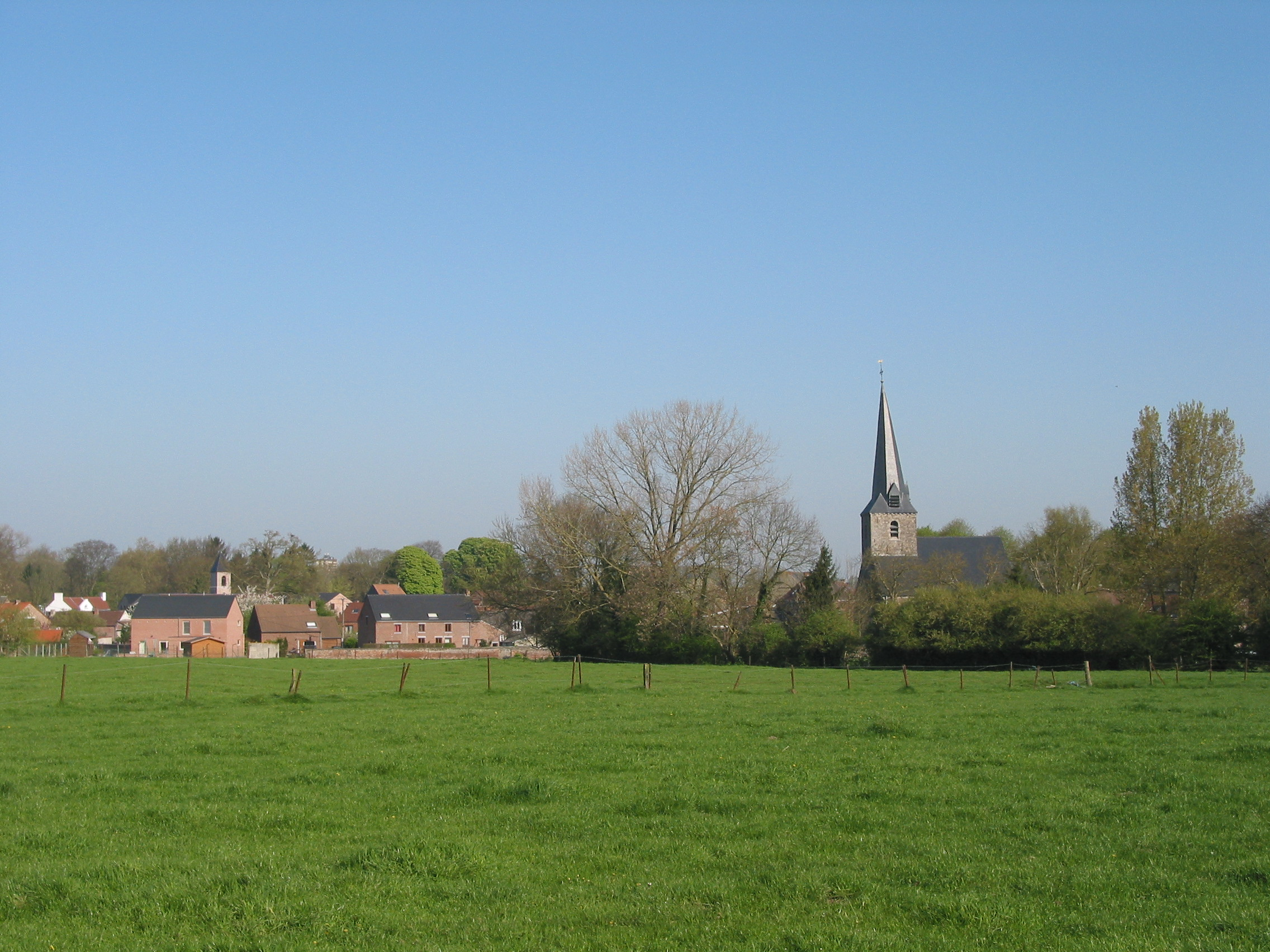
- The village

- Location of Saint-Symphorien in Mons
- Interactive map of Saint-Symphorien
- Location within Belgium Location within Hainaut (Belgium)
- Coordinates: 50°26′12″N 4°00′45″E
- Country: Belgium
- Community: French Community
- Region: Wallonia
- Province: Hainaut
- Arrondissement: Mons
- Municipality: Mons

Area
  - Total: 7.17 km^{2} (2.77 sq mi)

Population (2020-01-01)
  - Total: 3,349
  - Density: 467/km^{2} (1,210/sq mi)
- Postal codes: 7030
- Area codes: 065

Saint-Symphorien (French pronunciation: [sɛ̃ sɛ̃fɔʁjɛ̃]; Walloon: Sint-Symforyin) is a sub-municipality of the city of Mons located in the province of Hainaut, Wallonia, Belgium. It was a separate municipality until 1977. On 1 January 1977, it was merged into Mons.

== Heritage ==
The village's military cemetery contains about 500 German and Commonwealth graves from the First World War.

== Gallery ==
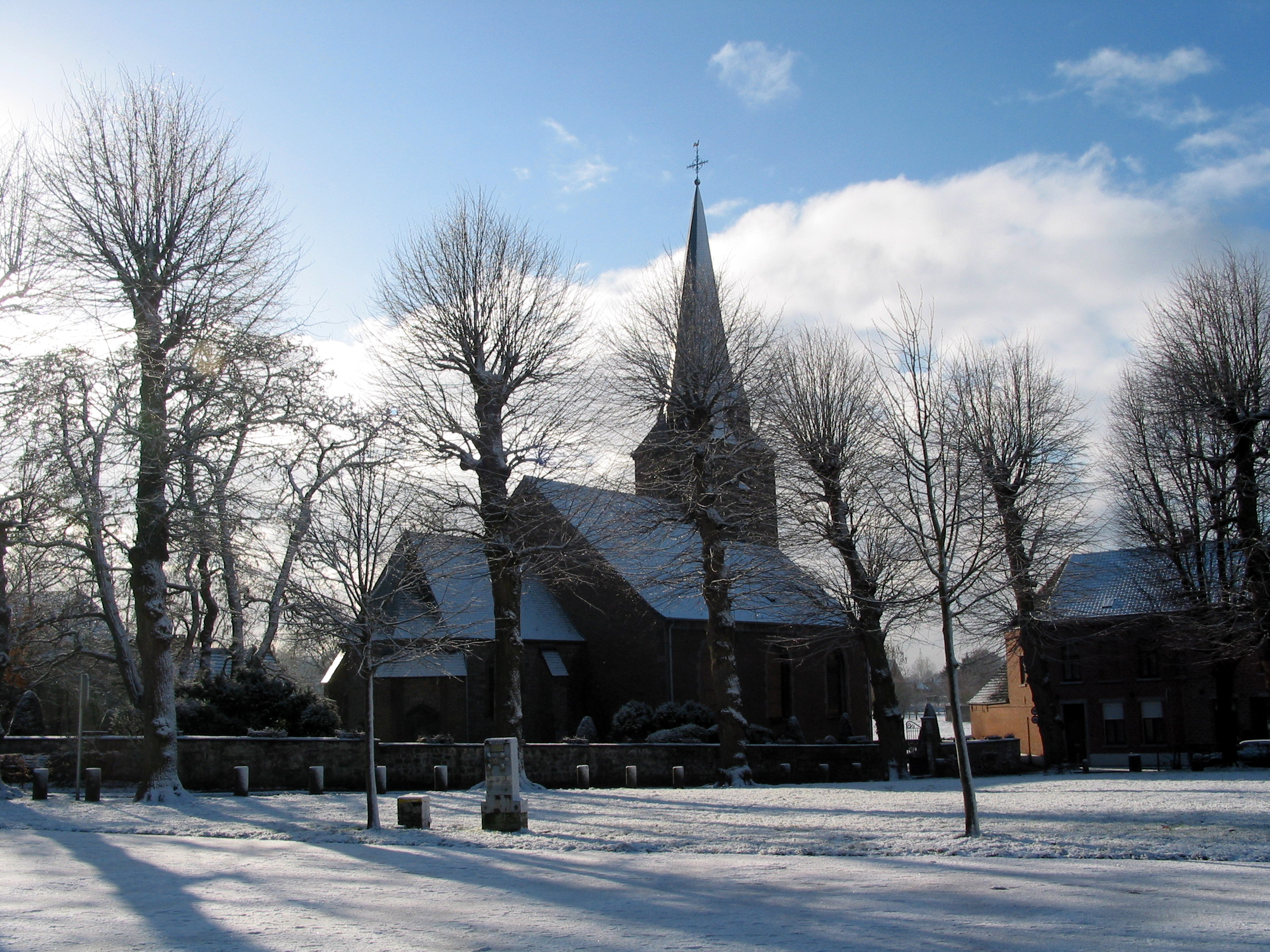
Church

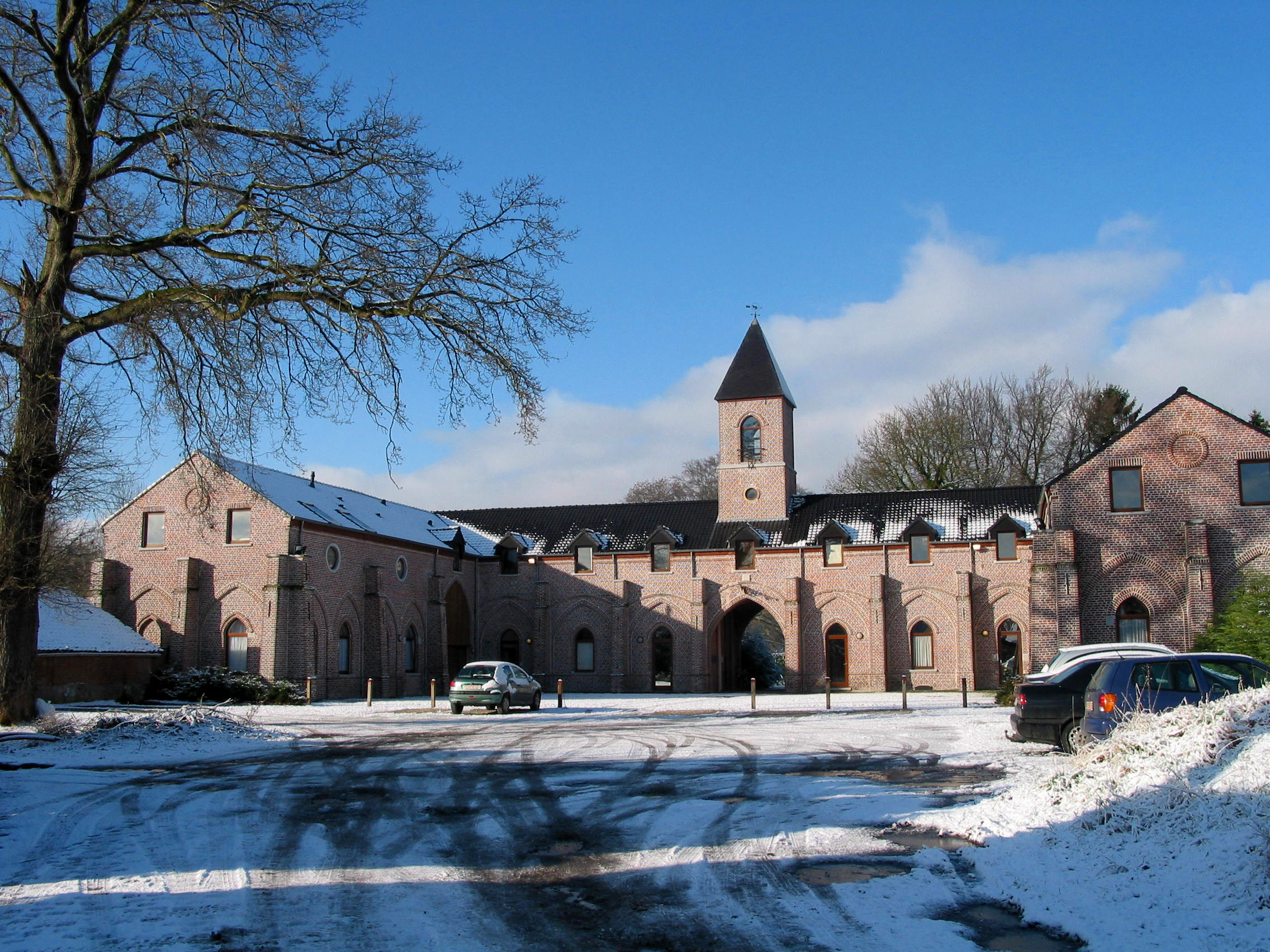
Distillery (1854)

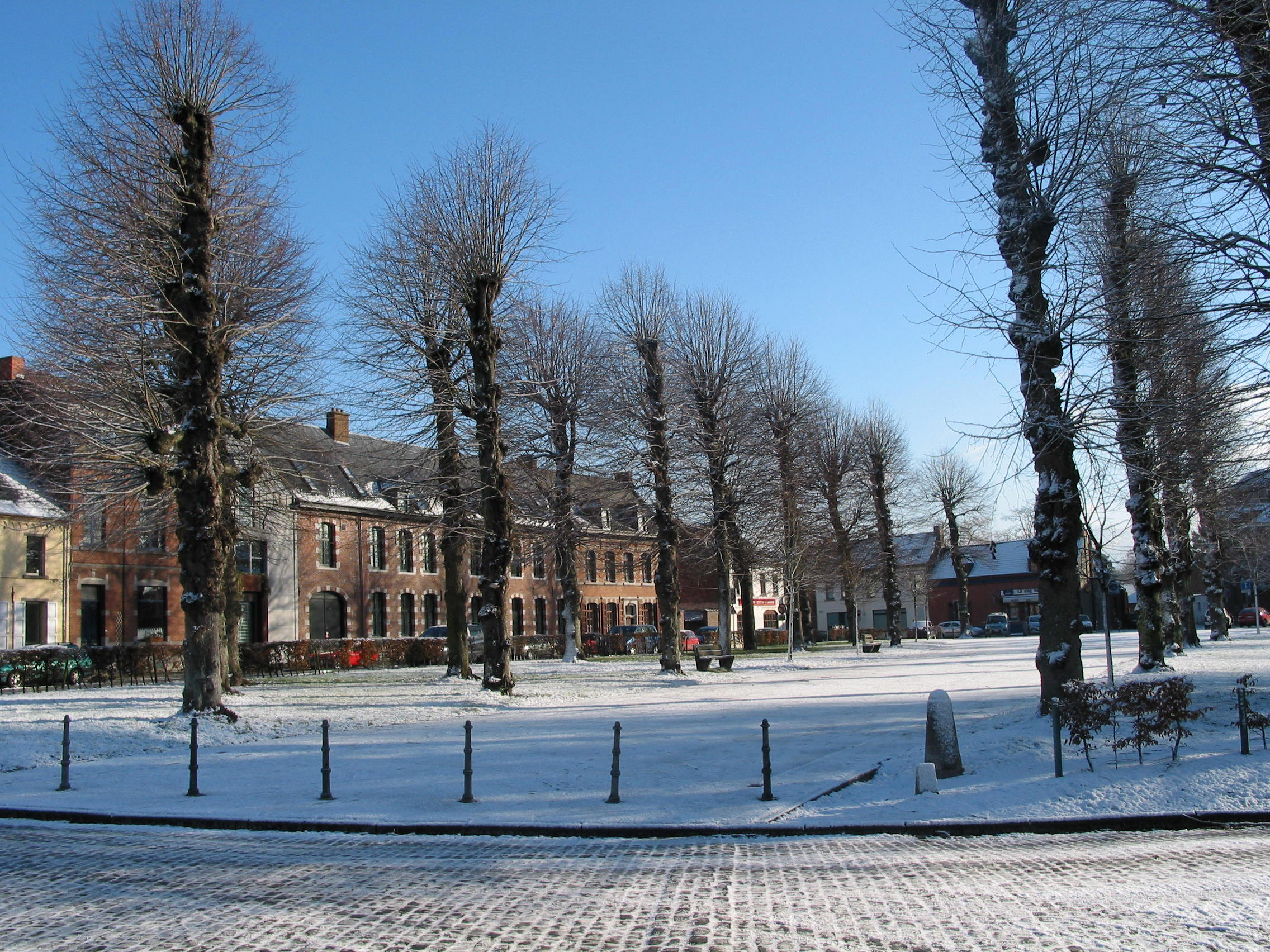
Place

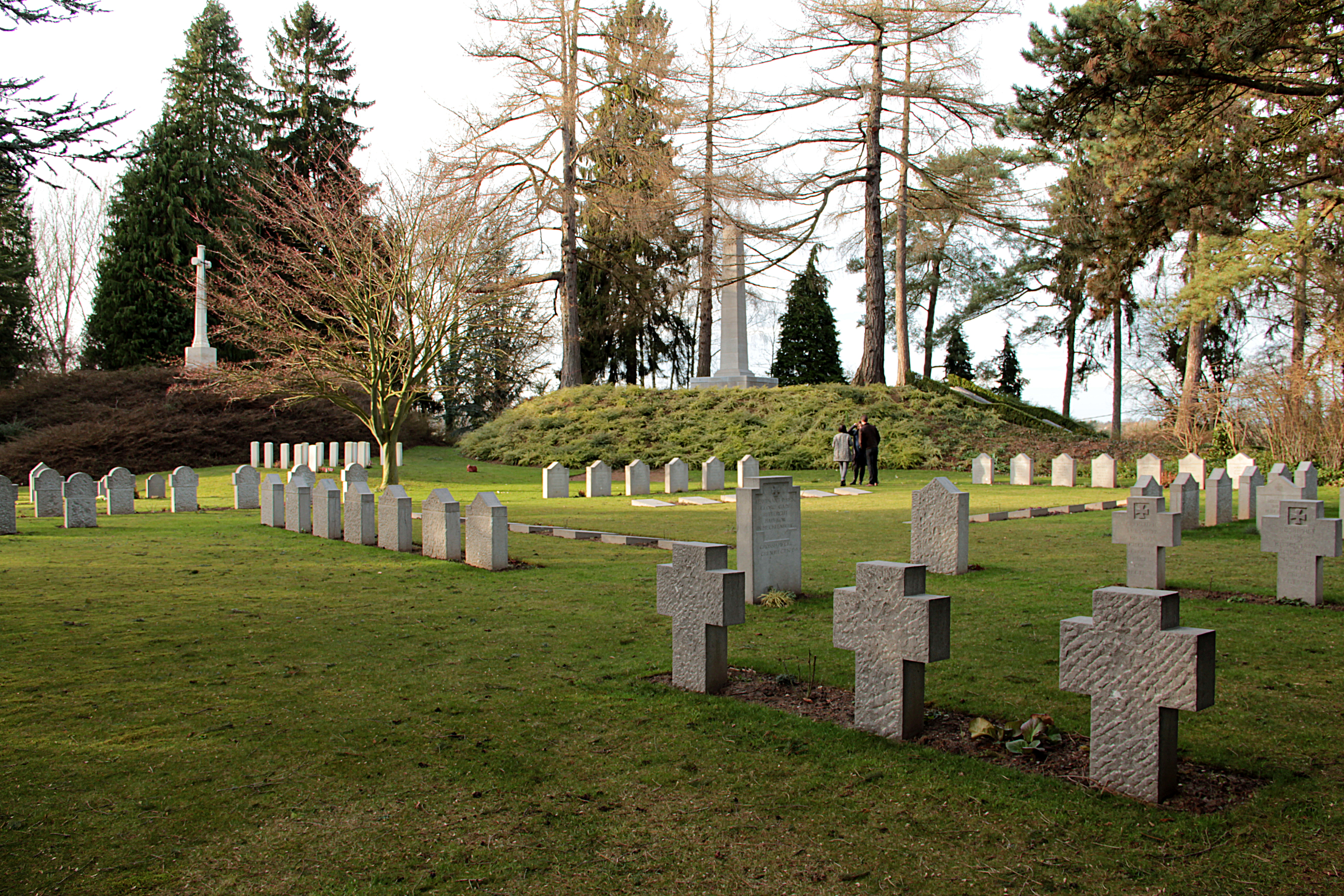
International Military Cemetery, German and British memorial
