= 1st Pomeranian Landwehr Cavalry =

- 1. Pommersches Landwehr-Kavallerie
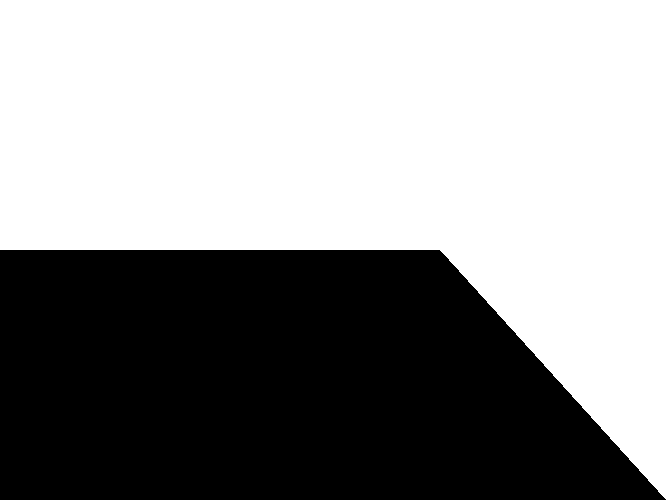
- Pennant used by the Pommersches Landwehr Kavallerie on their lances.
- Active: 1813–1815
- Country: Prussia
- Allegiance: Prussian Army
- Branch: Army
- Type: Cavalry
- Engagements: Napoleonic Wars
- Battle honours: Dennewitz 6 September 1813; Leipzig 16–18 October 1813

Commanders
- Notable commanders: Major von Blankenburg

The 1st Pomeranian Landwehr Cavalry (German: 1. Pommersches Landwehr-Kavallerie) was a cavalry regiment of the Prussian Army during the Napoleonic Wars.

== History ==
On 17 March 1813, King Frederick William III ordered the formation of the Landwehr cavalry. The regiment was formed from June to July 1813. The 1st Squadron of the regiment was formed in early July from several contingents in Pyritz and Greifenhagen. The 2nd Squadron was formed almost entirely from men from Pyritz. The 3rd Squadron consisted of 28 from Pyritz, 30 from Greifenhagen, and 15 from Saatzig, and formed up in Massow. The 4th Squadron formed in Naugard on 1 July by combining detachments from Saatzig and Daber.

In 1813, the regiment participated in the War of the Sixth Coalition as part of the Prussian III Corps under General Friedrich Wilhelm von Bülow. At the Battle of Großbeeren, it participated as part of the 6th Brigade under Major General Karl August Adolf von Krafft, and achieved good results for the Prussian Army. The regiment was also later involved in the Battle of Dennewitz, as well as at the Battle of Leipzig. From November 1813 until January 1814, the unit was attached to the 4th Brigade under Lieutenant General August von Thümen.

During the Waterloo campaign, the regiment formed part of the IV Army Corps. At the Battle of Waterloo, the regiment acted as part of the Reserve Cavalry of the IV Corps. During the Allied advance into France, the regiment advanced from Creil to Senlis, where they drove off small French contingent before being driven away by a French cuirassier brigade. The regiment also formed part of the advance guard of the Prussian IV Army Corps.

On 4 July, during the closing stages of the Hundred Days, Major von Blankenburg, who was commanding the regiment at the time, was notified that the French garrison at Paris had surrendered and would move to Orléans, and received orders to take up positions along the main road from Paris to Orléans, and to report immediately if the French army diverged from the main road. The regiment then left Versailles on 6 July 1815, and followed the French rear guard from Stampes to Angerville. The regiment was joined with a Silesian Landwehr fusilier battalion along with a small contingent of the Neumark Landwehr. From there, the regiment marched from Angerville to Blois. The regiment demobilized following the end of the Napoleonic Wars.

== Uniforms and equipment ==
The Pomeranian Landwehr Cavalry wore a Landwehr "Litewka" coat made of grey cloth. They also wore a gray shako with the Prussian cockade on it, along with a black cartridge box and a black sword belt and hanger. The unit was issued with lances with a bicolor lance pennant with the colors of Prussia on them (white on black).
