= 9th (2nd Pomeranian) Colberg Grenadier Regiment "Count Gneisenau" =

- Colbergsches Grenadier-Regiment "Graf Gneisenau“ (2. Pommersches) Nr. 9
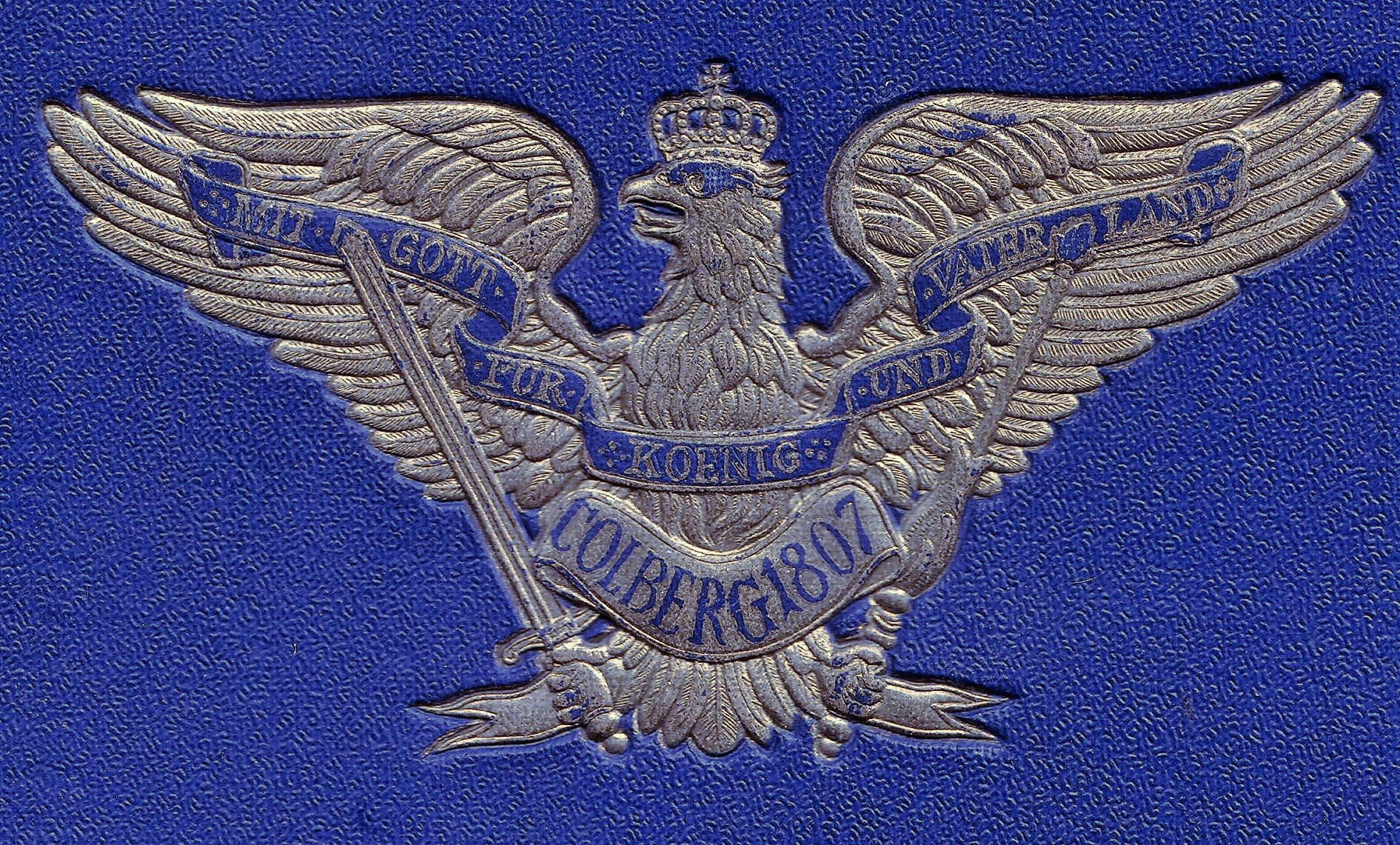
- Insignia of the 9th Colberg Grenadier Regiment
- Active: 1808 – 1918
- Country: Prussia
- Branch: Prussian Army
- Type: Infantry
- Patron: August Neidhardt von Gneisenau

Commanders
- Notable commanders: Melchior von Boemcken (first); Max Wobring (last)

The 9th (2nd Pomeranian) Colberg Grenadier Regiment "Count Gneisenau" (German: Colbergsches Grenadier-Regiment „Graf Gneisenau“ (2. Pommersches) Nr. 9), otherwise known as the Colberg Infantry Regiment (German: Colbergsches Infanterie-Regiment) was an infantry unit of the Prussian Army.

== History ==
The unit was established following the end of the Siege of Kolberg. Two infantry regiments were formed from the Prussian soldiers at Kolberg, including the 8th (1st Brandenburg) Life Grenadiers "King Frederick William III" and the 9th (2nd Pomeranian) Colberg Grenadier Regiment "Count Gneisenau".

From 26 August 1808 until 27 May 1810, the unit was under the leadership of Major Melchior von Boemcken.

During the War of the Sixth Coalition, the unit took part in the Battle of Großbeeren as part of the 6th Brigade of the Prussian III Army Corps. The regiment also took part in the Battle of Leipzig. The regiment also took part in the Battle of Ligny during the prelude to the Battle of Waterloo.

At the Battle of Waterloo, the unit did not arrive until around the evening. By then, the French army at Waterloo had already lost the battle, and thus, the unit did not play a decisive role in the battle.

=== Austro-Prussian War ===
During the Austro-Prussian War, the unit was assigned to the 4th Infantry Division of the Prussian II Army Corps. It took part in the Battle of Königgrätz against Austrian forces.

=== Franco-Prussian War ===
During the Franco-Prussian War, the unit took part in the Battle of Gravelotte against French forces, as well as the Sieges of Metz and Paris.

=== First World War ===
The unit was assigned to the 5th Infantry Brigade until 14 January 1915, and reassigned to the 6th Guards Infantry Brigade from 15 January 1915 until some time in December 1918. Following the Armistice of Compiègne, the remnants of the regiment returned home, and the regiment demobilized on 19 December 1918 at Stargard.
