= Jody (given name) =

Jody is a unisex given name. For men, it is sometimes a short form (hypocorism) for Joseph and other names. Notable people with the given name include:

== Men ==
- Jody Azzouni (born 1954), American philosopher, short fiction writer and poet
- Jody Byrne (footballer) (born 1963), Irish retired footballer
- Jody Campbell (born 1960), American former water polo player
- Jody Carr (born 1975), Canadian politician
- Jody Cortez (born 1960), American drummer
- Jody Craddock (born 1975), English footballer
- Jody Cundy (born 1978), English cyclist and former swimmer
- Jody Davis (baseball) (born 1952), American Major League Baseball catcher
- Jody Dean (born 1959), American journalist and author
- Jody Dobrowski (1981–2005), English murder victim
- Jody Fleisch (born 1980), English professional wrestler
- Jody Fortson (born 1997), American football player
- Jody Gage (born 1959), Canadian hockey player and general manager
- Jody Gerut (born 1977), American former Major League Baseball player
- Jody Gormley (1971–2024), Gaelic football manager and former player and coach
- Jody Hamilton (1938–2021), American professional wrestler, promoter and trainer
- Jody Harris (fl. 1973–1990), American guitarist, singer, songwriter and composer
- Jody Hice (born 1960), American politician and syndicated radio show host
- Jody Hill (born 1976), American film director and screenwriter
- Jody Holden (born 1968), Canadian beach volleyball player
- Jody Hull (born 1969), Canadian retired National Hockey League player
- Jody Jenneker (born 1984), South African rugby union player
- Jody Kollapen (born 1957), South African judge
- Jody Kraus, law professor
- Jody Latham (born 1982), English actor
- Jody Lavender (born 1979), American racing driver
- Jody Lehman (born 1975), Canadian-British professional ice hockey player
- Jody Lloyd, New Zealand electronica and hip-hop musician and record producer
- Jody McBrayer (born 1970), American singer and songwriter
- Jody McCrea (1934–2009), American actor; son of actors Joel McCrea and Frances Dee
- Jody Morris (born 1978), English footballer
- Jody Payne (1936–2013), American country musician and singer
- Jody Porter (born 1969), American guitarist
- Jody Powell (1943–2009), White House Press Secretary for President Carter
- Jody Reed (born 1962), American retired Major League Baseball player
- Jody Reynolds (1932–2008), American singer and guitarist
- Jody Richards (born 1938), American politician and member of the Kentucky House of Representatives
- Jody Ridley (born 1942), former NASCAR driver
- Jody Rosen (born 1969), American journalist, music critic and author
- Jody Scheckter (born 1950), South African former auto racing driver
- Jody Sears (born 1967), American college football coach and former player
- Jody Shelley (born 1976), Canadian former National Hockey League player
- Jody Stecher (born 1946), American singer and musician
- Jody Stephens (born 1952), American drummer
- Jody Stewart (born 1986), Costa Rican footballer
- Jody Viviani (born 1982), French football goalkeeper
- Jody Weiner, American novelist, non-fiction author and lawyer
- Jody Weis (born 1957), former Superintendent of Police of the Chicago Police Department (2008–2011)
- Jody Williams (blues musician) (1935–2018), American blues guitarist and singer
- Jody Wisternoff (born 1973), English musician, disc jockey and record producer
- Jody Wright (born 1981), American football player and coach

== Women ==
- Jody Adams-Birch (born 1972), former women's basketball program head coach
- Jody Anschutz (born 1962), American golfer
- Jody Bleyle (fl. 1990s), American musician, songwriter and independent record label owner
- Jody A. Breckenridge, US Coast Guard vice admiral
- Jody Chiang (born 1961), Taiwanese retired singer
- Jody Conradt (born 1941), retired women's basketball coach
- Jody Diamond (born 1953), American composer, performer, writer, publisher, editor and educator
- Jody Gibson (1957–2022), American Hollywood escort agency madam from the late 1980s through the 1990s
- Jody Gladding (born 1955), American translator and poet
- Jody Marie Gnant (born 1981), American singer-songwriter and pianist
- Jody Handley (born 1979), English former footballer
- Jody Houser, American comic book writer
- Jody Kennedy (born 1981), Australian actress
- Jody Lawrance (1930–1986), American actress
- Jody Lee (born 1958), American fantasy artist
- Jody Linscott, American session musician and percussionist and children's book author
- Jody Lynn Nye (born 1957), American science fiction writer
- Jody-Anne Maxwell (born 1986), Jamaican Spelling Bee winner
- Jody McNally, American politician
- Jody Miller (born Myrna Joy Miller, 1941–2022), American country music singer
- Jody Miller (criminologist), American criminology professor
- Jody Jean Olson (born 1975), also known as India Summer, American pornographic actress
- Jody Patrick (born 1978), Canadian former badminton player
- Jody Sperling, American dancer and choreographer
- Jody Thompson (born 1976), Canadian actress
- Jody Tini (born 1976), New Zealand basketball player
- Jody Toor, Canadian politician
- Jody Upshaw (born 2003), Canadian R&B musician
- Jody Vance (born 1967), Canadian TV sports anchor
- Jody Wagner (born 1955), American politician
- Jody Watley (born 1959), American singer, songwriter and record producer
- Jody Williams (born 1950), American political activist and Nobel Peace Prize laureate
- Jody Williams (Afrikaans singer) (born 1990), South African pop/R&B singer
- Jody Wilson-Raybould, Canadian politician

== See also ==
- Jodie
- Jody (disambiguation)
- Jodi (disambiguation)
