= Jodi (disambiguation) =

Jodi is a given name.

Jodi may also refer to:

- Jodi (1999 film), an Indian Tamil-language film
- Jodi (2001 film), an Indian Kannada-language film
- Jodi (2019 film), an Indian Telugu-language film
- Jodi (2023 film), an Indian Punjabi-language film
- Jodi (art collective), a pair of artists responsible for the website jodi.org
- "Jodi", a song by Art Blakey and the Jazz Messengers from Gypsy Folk Tales
- Joint Organisations Data Initiative, international center for fossil fuel information
- Hodï, an indigenous people group in the Amazon Rainforest also known as Jodï
- Jodi Shurbet, stage name Scruffpuppie, American indie rock musician

== See also ==
- Jody (disambiguation)
- Jodi No.1 (disambiguation)
- Jodie, a given name
