= Shale band =

Term in economics of petroleum extraction

In the economics of petroleum extraction, the term shale band refers to the range of global oil prices that can support current levels of United States shale oil extraction via hydraulic fracturing techniques.

== Price range ==
The term was defined on May 8, 2015 by Olivier Jakob, the director of Petromatrix, a Swiss-based consultancy company that publishes a daily note on the oil markets. Petromatrix described the shale band as a price range between $45 and $65 per barrel for West Texas Intermediate (WTI) crude oil. Below $45 per barrel, production of US shale oil would fall sharply, and above $65 production would surge. According to Olivier Jakob, the price of crude oil would, therefore, remain within that range as long as the US remained the swing producer of crude oil in an environment where OPEC is producing at capacity. The concept of the shale band was subsequently verified in the market action of 2015 and the Wall Street Journal characterized the shale band as one of the key terms and phrases from 2015. The term is now widely used in by the financial press and market analysts to describe the price action of oil during over the year of 2015 and 2016.

The price reference used by Petromatrix for the shale band is based on the CME WTI futures contract for the month of December of the next calendar year, a contract also known as the Red December contract. Due to cost reductions taken by US shale oil producers, Olivier Jakob revised the shale band in August 2016 lower by $5 per barrel to a range between $40–$60, on the basis of the WTI December contract for the next calendar year.
