= IEF =

IEF may refer to:

- Index of Economic Freedom
- Integrated Education Fund (Northern Ireland)
- International Energy Forum
- Isoelectric focusing
- Islamic Enlightenment Foundation
- International e-Sports Festival
