= Ferneyhough =

Ferneyhough is a surname. Notable people with the surname include:

- Brian Ferneyhough (born 1943), English composer of modern classical music
- Jodie Ferneyhough, President of the Canadian Music Publishers Association

== See also ==
- Fernyhough
