= Nancy Calef =

American painter

- Born: Bronx, New York USA
- Occupations: Painter, Illustrator, Author, Speaker, Singer, Songwriter
- Known for: Peoplescapes, 3D Abstracts
- Spouse: Jody Weiner
- Website: https://www.nancycalefgallery.com

Nancy Calef is a contemporary American figurative painter, illustrator and author. Her work is distinguished by the technique of sculpting off the canvas with clay to produce paintings in three-dimensional high relief. Calef is also a singer/songwriter.

== Biography ==
Born in New York City, Calef graduated from the Bronx High School of Science at age 15 and received a scholarship from the College of New Rochelle to study painting and sculpture. She exhibits widely in museums and galleries in solo and group shows.

Calef has lived in Europe and Thailand and has traveled throughout the U.S., Mexico, Central America, Southeast Asia, India and Nepal. She has lived in San Francisco since 1977. Calef’s studio is in the city’s North Beach district where she exhibits in numerous galleries and the Beat Museum.

Calef is co-author with Jody Weiner of Peoplescapes: My Story from Purging to Painting. The memoir chronicles Calef’s evolution from child model suffering anorexia and bulimia, through recovery and maturation into a multi-disciplined artist. The book contains 149 color images of her 3D oil paintings. “Expressing myself through art provided a foothold to wrestle my self-destructive demons and connect to the world. I channeled those negative impulses into disciplined production,” Calef was quoted as saying in an article about her in the San Francisco Chronicle.

She also speaks about the role of art therapy in treating eating disorders.

Calef is also a co-author of Nothing But the Truth So Help Me God. Her work has also been featured in books by other authors. She speaks at literary and art forums including Litquake.

She is married to author Jody Weiner.

== Work ==
The Oregon Literary Review describes Calef’s oil and mixed media paintings as presenting "people juxtaposed in ordinary situations while humorously addressing issues facing society." Calef calls her three-dimensional paintings "Peoplescapes." Adding colorful details including sculpture fabrics and found objects, Calef’s Peoplescapes highlight society’s madness.

Peoplescapes often depict such universal experiences as a demonstration, cocktail party or airplane ride. In one such painting entitled “No Free Lunch” Calef portrays a flight attendant selling gas masks, water and toilet paper to emphasize nothing is free.

Writing in Professional Artist magazine, Jenny Andreasson describes Calef’s Peoplescapes as capturing “the social, political and spiritual issues facing society through a juxtaposition of faces and objects woven together into a story with a pinch of humor. According to Repurposed magazine, her technique has evolved to repurposing computer monitors, motherboards and internal parts to create musical characters, a reminder of technology's dominating presence in all aspects of our lives."

A progression of Peoplescapes is Calef’s “plane slashing” technique in which she tears, cuts and manipulates the plane of an existing painting while integrating it with one or more finished canvases, and then adds sculpture and found objects. The Healing Power of Art and Artists has cited Calef as a leading eco-conscious artist utilizing recycled materials.

Many of Calef’s paintings address issues facing society. In 1999 and 2000, Calef served as an artist in residence at the State of the World Forum where she painted and drew religious and political world leaders including Mikhail Gorbachev and Queen Noor of Jordan. Calef’s painting Hashtag Dummy Potus is featured in Not Normal: Art in the Age of Trump by Karen M. Gutfreund. The 1,000 Hours of Outrage Project included Calef’s painting War Room USR in its visual response to Trump administration policies In 2021, UK-based Art from the Heart awarded Calef artist of the month.

Her painting "Modern Deluge" was shown in a 2004 national juried exhibition entitled "Perceptions of the President" at Koo’s Gallery in Long Beach, California. Calef’s painting entitled “"page":0,"issue_id":360208 Hashtag Dummy POTUS” appeared in the December, 2016 issue of San Francisco magazine. In 2021, her work was included in several group exhibitions. These include Vices, a national juried exhibition at Arc Gallery in San Francisco, Sacred Strands curated by Elaine Nguyen, and Manhattan Arts International in New York City. In 2021, Calef received two awards from the South San Francisco Art Commission for her painting entitled Study in Contrast. These include second place for painting and third best in show.

Calef’s painting entitled Inevitability Line won first place in the “naïve art-figure” category in the 2025 World Art Awards. Her painting entitled Spirit of Democracy won fourth place in the “political commentary” category” also in the 2025 World Art Awards.
