= Jodi =

Jodi is a feminine given name which may refer to:

== People ==
- Jodi Albert (born 1983), English actress
- Jodi Anasta (born 1985), Australian actress and model
- Jodi Anderson (born 1957), American heptathlete
- Jodi Appelbaum-Steinbauer (born 1956), American professional tennis player
- Jodi Applegate (born 1964), American news anchor
- Jodi Arias (born 1980), perpetrator of the murder of Travis Alexander
- Jodi Benson (born 1961), American voice actress and singer
- Jodi Brown (born 1981), New Zealand international netball representative
- Jodi Carlisle (born 1960), American actress
- Jodi DiPiazza (born 2001) American musical prodigy
- Jodi Hildebrandt (born 1969), American counselor convicted of child abuse
- Jodi Huisentruit (born 1968), American television news anchor whose disappearance is an unsolved mystery
- Jodi Jones (died 2003), British female murder victim
- Jodi Jones (footballer) (born 1997), English professional footballer
- Jodi Kantor (born 1975), American journalist
- Jodi Long (born 1954), Asian American actress
- Jodi Magness (born 1956), American biblical scholar
- Jodi Martin (born 1976), Australian singer-songwriter
- Jodi McKay (born 1969), Australian politician and television presenter
- Jodi Leigh Miller (born 1972), American female bodybuilder and figure competitor
- Jodi Lyn O'Keefe (born 1978), American actress and model
- Jodi Ann Paterson (born 1975), American model, actress and former beauty queen
- Jodi Phillis (born 1965), Australian singer-songwriter
- Jodi Picoult (born 1967), American author
- Jodi Proznick (born 1975), Canadian jazz bassist
- Jodi Rell (born 1946), former Governor of Connecticut
- Jodi Salvo, American politician
- Jodi Santamaria (born 1982), Filipina actress
- Jodi Shilling (born 1979), American actress
- Jodi Thelen (born 1962), American actress
- Jodi Thomas, American author
- Jodi Tymeson (born 1955), member of the Iowa House of Representatives
- Jodi Vaughan (born 1950), country singer, songwriter, recording artist and television performer
- Jodi White, Canadian politician, Chief of Staff to Prime Minister Kim Campbell in 1993
- Jodi Wille, American book editor, filmmaker and photographer

== Fictional characters ==
- Jodi Lerner, on the television series The L Word

== See also ==
- Jodie (disambiguation)
- Jody (given name)
