= Jodi No.1 =

Jodi No.1 or Jodi Number One (lit. 'Couple No.1') may refer to:

- Jodi No.1 (film), a 2001 Indian film
- Jodi No.1 (2003 film) or Mysterious Girl, a 2003 Indian film
- Jodi No.1 (TV series), an Indian dance competition show aired from 2006
  - Jodi No.1 (Marathi TV series), its Marathi-language version
  - Jodi No.1 (Kannada TV series), its Kannada-language version
    - Jodi No.1 Season 2

== See also ==
- Jodi (disambiguation)
- No. 1 (disambiguation)
