= OPEC =

International petroleum organization

Organization of the Petroleum Exporting Countries
- Flag Emblem

- Founding (dark blue) and current (medium blue) members of OPEC, members of OPEC+ (light blue), and former OPEC members (red)
- Headquarters: Vienna, Austria
- Official languages: English
- Type: Intergovernmental organization, Cartel
- Membership: 11 member states: Algeria; Republic of the Congo; Equatorial Guinea; Gabon; Iran; Iraq; Kuwait; Libya; Nigeria; Saudi Arabia; Venezuela; 11 OPEC+ member states: Azerbaijan; Bahrain; Brazil; Brunei; Kazakhstan; Malaysia; Mexico; Oman; Russia; South Sudan; Sudan

Leaders
  - Secretary General: Haitham al-Ghais
- Establishment: Baghdad, Iraq
  - Statute: 14 September 1960 (66 years ago)
  - In effect: January 1961 (65 years ago)
- Website opec.org

The Organization of the Petroleum Exporting Countries (OPEC /ˈoʊpɛk/ OH-pek) is an intergovernmental cartel enabling the co-operation of leading oil-producing and oil-dependent countries in order to collectively influence the global oil market and maximize profit. It was founded on 14 September 1960 in Baghdad by the first five members: Iran, Iraq, Kuwait, Saudi Arabia and Venezuela. The organization, which currently comprises 11 member countries, accounted for 38 percent of global oil production in 2022. It is estimated that 79.5 percent of the world's proven oil reserves are located within OPEC nations, with the Middle East alone accounting for 67.2 percent of OPEC's total reserves.

In a series of steps in the 1960s and 1970s, OPEC restructured the global system of oil production in favor of oil-producing states and away from an oligopoly of dominant Anglo-American oil firms, the "Seven Sisters". In the 1970s, restrictions in oil production led to a dramatic rise in oil prices with long-lasting and far-reaching consequences for the global economy. Since the 1980s, OPEC has had a limited impact on world oil-supply and oil-price stability, as there is frequent cheating by members on their commitments to one another, and as member commitments reflect what they would do even in the absence of OPEC.

The formation of OPEC marked a turning point toward national sovereignty over natural resources. OPEC decisions have come to play a prominent role in the global oil market and in international relations. Economists have characterized OPEC as a textbook example of a cartel, a group whose members cooperate to reduce market competition and obtain monopoly profits.

The current OPEC members are Algeria, Equatorial Guinea, Gabon, Iran, Iraq, Kuwait, Libya, Nigeria, the Republic of the Congo, Saudi Arabia, and Venezuela. The former members are Angola, Ecuador, Indonesia, Qatar, and the United Arab Emirates. OPEC+ is a larger group consisting of OPEC members and other oil-producing countries. It was formed in late 2016 to better control the global crude oil market. Canada, Egypt, Norway, and Oman have attended some meetings as observers. The United Arab Emirates left both OPEC and OPEC+ in 2026.

== Organization and structure ==
In a series of steps in the 1960s and 1970s, OPEC restructured the global system of oil production in favor of oil-producing states and away from an oligopoly of dominant Anglo-American oil firms, the Seven Sisters. Coordination among oil-producing states within OPEC made it easier for them to nationalize oil production and structure oil prices in their favor without incurring punishment by Western governments and firms.

Prior to the creation of OPEC, individual oil-producing states were punished for taking steps to alter the governing arrangements of oil production within their borders. States were coerced militarily (e.g. in 1953, the US and UK sponsored a coup against Mohammad Mosaddegh after his government nationalized Iran's oil production) or economically (e.g. the Seven Sisters slowed down oil production in one non-compliant state and ramped up oil production elsewhere) when they acted contrary to the interests of the Seven Sisters and their governments.

The organisational logic that underpins OPEC is that it is in the collective interest of its members to limit the world oil supply in order to reap higher prices. However, the main problem within OPEC is that it is individually rational for members to cheat on commitments and produce as much oil as possible.

Political scientist Jeff Colgan has argued that OPEC has since the 1980s largely failed to achieve its goals (limits on world oil supply, stabilized prices, and raising of long-term average revenues). He finds that members have cheated on 96% of their commitments. The analysis spans over the period 1982–2009. To the extent that member states comply with their commitments, it is because the commitments reflect what they would do even if OPEC did not exist. One large reason for the frequent cheating is that OPEC does not punish members for non-compliance with commitments.

=== Leadership and decision-making ===
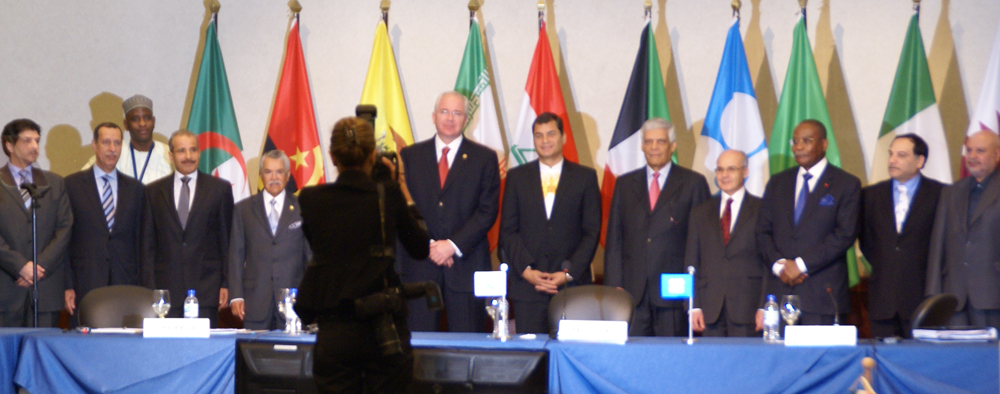
OPEC Conference delegates at Swissotel, Quito, Ecuador, December 2010

The OPEC Conference is the supreme authority of the organisation, and consists of delegations normally headed by the oil ministers of member countries. The chief executive of the organisation is the OPEC secretary general. The conference ordinarily meets at the Vienna headquarters, at least twice a year and in additional extraordinary sessions when necessary. It generally operates on the principles of unanimity and "one member, one vote", with each country paying an equal membership fee into the annual budget. However, since Saudi Arabia is by far the largest and most-profitable oil exporter in the world, with enough capacity to function as the traditional swing producer to balance the global market, it serves as "OPEC's de facto leader".

=== International cartel ===
At various times, OPEC members have displayed apparent anti-competitive cartel behavior through the organisation's agreements about oil production and price levels. Economists often cite OPEC as a textbook example of a cartel that cooperates to reduce market competition, as in this definition from OECD's Glossary of Industrial Organisation Economics and Competition Law:

International commodity agreements covering products such as coffee, sugar, tin and more recently oil (OPEC: Organisation of Petroleum Exporting Countries) are examples of international cartels which have publicly entailed agreements between different national governments.

While OPEC is at times cited as a textbook example of a cartel, various authoritative and academic sources provide a broader perspective on the organization's role. For instance, the US Energy Information Administration's glossary explains OPEC as:

An intergovernmental organization whose stated objective is to 'coordinate and unify the petroleum policies of member countries'.

The Oxford Dictionary of Energy Science (2017) defines OPEC as:

An organization set up in 1960 to coordinate petroleum policies among its member countries, initially with the aim of securing a regular supply to consuming countries at a price that gave a fair return on capital investment.

OPEC members strongly prefer to describe their organisation as a modest force for market stabilisation, rather than a powerful anti-competitive cartel. In its defense, the organisation was founded as a counterweight against the previous "Seven Sisters" cartel of multinational oil companies, and non-OPEC energy suppliers have maintained enough market share for a substantial degree of worldwide competition. Because of an economic "prisoner's dilemma" that encourages each member nation individually to discount its price and exceed its production quota, widespread cheating within OPEC often erodes its ability to influence global oil prices through collective action. Political scientist Jeff Colgan has challenged the notion that OPEC is a cartel, pointing to endemic cheating in the organization: "A cartel needs to set tough goals and meet them; OPEC sets easy goals and fails to meet even those."

OPEC has not been involved in any disputes related to the competition rules of the World Trade Organization, even though the objectives, actions, and principles of the two organisations diverge considerably. A key US District Court decision held that OPEC consultations are protected as "governmental" acts of state by the Foreign Sovereign Immunities Act, and are therefore beyond the legal reach of US competition law governing "commercial" acts. Despite popular sentiment against OPEC, legislative proposals to limit the organisation's sovereign immunity, such as the NOPEC Act, have so far been unsuccessful.

=== Conflicts ===
OPEC often has difficulty agreeing on policy decisions because its member countries differ widely in their oil export capacities, production costs, reserves, geological features, population, economic development, budgetary situations, and political circumstances. Over the course of market cycles, oil reserves can themselves become a source of serious conflict, instability and imbalances, in what economists call the "natural resource curse". A further complication is that religion-linked conflicts in the Middle East are recurring features of the geopolitical landscape for this oil-rich region.

Internationally important conflicts in OPEC's history have included the Six-Day War (1967), Yom Kippur War (1973), a hostage siege directed by Palestinian militants (1975), the Iranian Revolution (1979), the Iran–Iraq War (1980–1988), the Iraqi occupation of Kuwait (1990–1991), the September 11 attacks (2001), the American occupation of Iraq (2003–2011), the conflict in the Niger Delta (2004–present), the Arab Spring (2010–2012), the Libyan crisis (2011–present), and the international Embargo against Iran (2012–2016). Although events such as these can temporarily disrupt oil supplies and elevate prices, the frequent disputes and instabilities tend to limit OPEC's long-term cohesion and effectiveness.

== History and impact ==
=== Post-WWII situation ===
In 1949, Venezuela initiated the move towards the establishment of what would become OPEC, by inviting Iran, Iraq, Kuwait and Saudi Arabia to exchange views and explore avenues for more regular and closer communication among petroleum-exporting nations as the world recovered from World War II. At the time, some of the world's largest oil fields were just entering production in the Middle East. The United States had established the Interstate Oil Compact Commission to join the Texas Railroad Commission in limiting overproduction.

The US was simultaneously the world's largest producer and consumer of oil; the world market was dominated by a group of multinational companies known as the "Seven Sisters", five of which were headquartered in the US following the breakup of John D. Rockefeller's original Standard Oil monopoly. Oil-exporting countries were eventually motivated to form OPEC as a counterweight to this concentration of political and economic power.

=== 1959–1960: Anger from exporting countries ===
In February 1959, as new supplies were becoming available, the multinational oil companies (MOCs) unilaterally reduced their posted prices for Venezuelan and Middle Eastern crude oil by 10 percent. Weeks later, the Arab League's first Arab Petroleum Congress convened in Cairo, Egypt, where the influential journalist Wanda Jablonski introduced Saudi Arabia's Abdullah Tariki to Venezuela's observer Juan Pablo Pérez Alfonzo, representing the two then-largest oil-producing nations outside the United States and the Soviet Union.

Both oil ministers were angered by the price cuts, and the two led their fellow delegates to establish the Maadi Pact or Gentlemen's Agreement, calling for an "Oil Consultation Commission" of exporting countries, to which MOCs should present price-change plans. Jablonski reported a marked hostility toward the West and a growing outcry against "absentee landlordism" of the MOCs, which at the time controlled all oil operations within the exporting countries and wielded enormous political influence. In August 1960, ignoring the warnings, and with the US favoring Canadian and Mexican oil for strategic reasons, the MOCs again unilaterally announced significant cuts in their posted prices for Middle Eastern crude oil.

=== 1960–1975: Founding and expansion ===
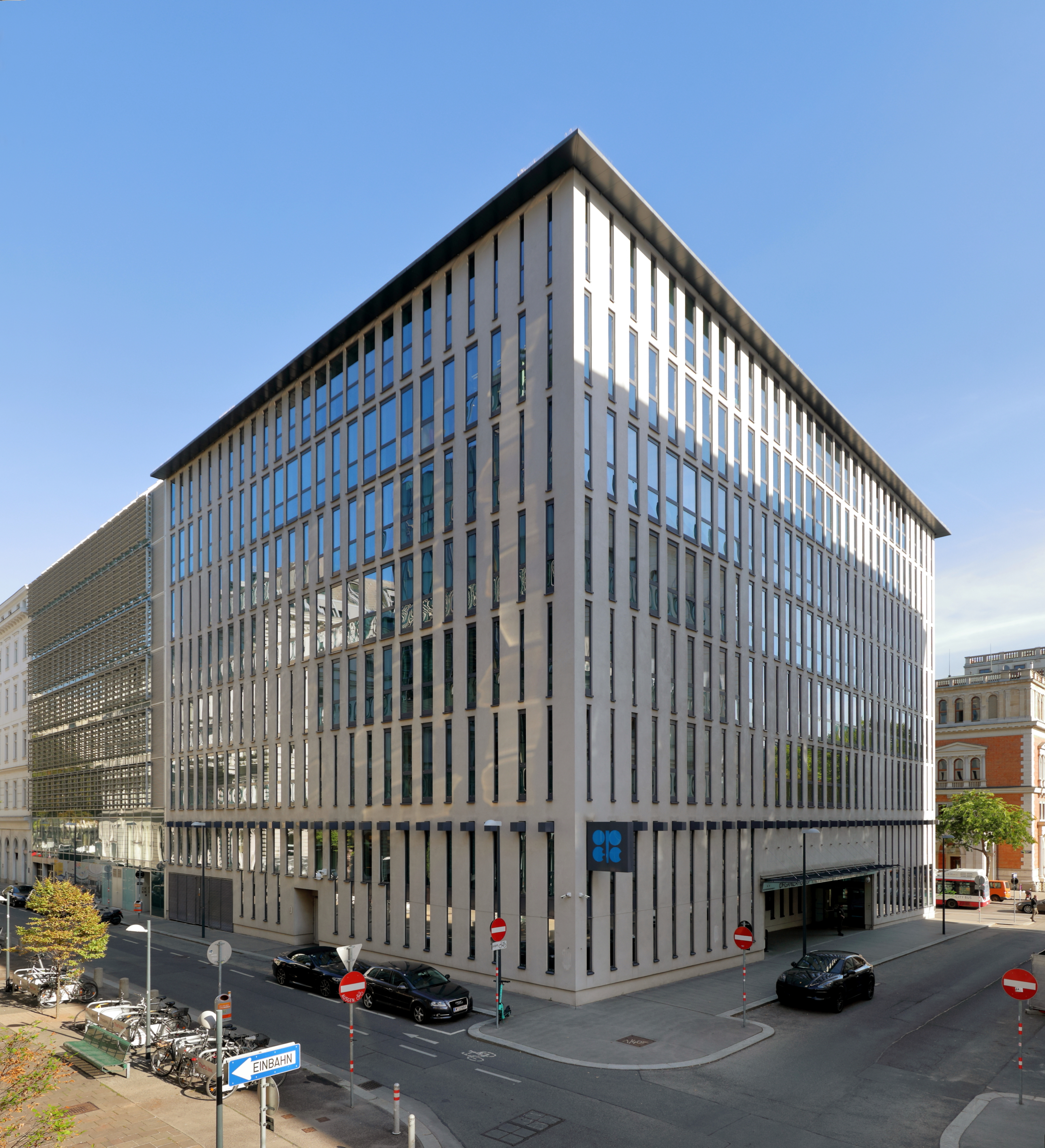
OPEC headquarters in Vienna

The following month, during 10–14 September 1960, the Baghdad Conference was held at the initiative of Tariki, Pérez Alfonzo, and Iraqi prime minister Abd al-Karim Qasim, whose country had skipped the 1959 congress. Government representatives from Iran, Iraq, Kuwait, Saudi Arabia and Venezuela met in Baghdad to discuss ways to increase the price of crude oil produced by their countries, and ways to respond to unilateral actions by the MOCs. Despite strong US opposition: "Together with Arab and non-Arab producers, Saudi Arabia formed the Organization of Petroleum Export Countries (OPEC) to secure the best price available from the major oil corporations."

The Middle Eastern members originally called for OPEC headquarters to be in Baghdad or Beirut. Venezuela argued for a neutral location, and so the organization chose Geneva, Switzerland. On 1 September 1965, OPEC moved to Vienna, Austria, after Switzerland declined to extend diplomatic privileges. At the time, Switzerland was attempting to reduce their foreign population and the OPEC was the first intergovernmental body to leave the country because of restrictions on foreigners. Austria was keen to attract international organizations and offered attractive terms to the OPEC.

During the early years of OPEC, the oil-producing countries had a 50/50 profit agreement with the oil companies. OPEC bargained with the dominant oil companies (the Seven Sisters), but OPEC faced coordination problems among its members. If one OPEC member demanded too much from the oil companies, then the oil companies could slow down production in that country and ramp up production elsewhere.

The 50/50 agreements were still in place until 1970 when Libya negotiated a 58/42 agreement with the oil company Occidental, which prompted other OPEC members to request better agreements with oil companies. In 1971, an accord was signed between major oil companies and members of OPEC doing business in the Mediterranean Sea region, called the Tripoli Agreement. The agreement, signed on 2 April 1971, raised oil prices and increased producing countries' profit shares.

From 1961 to 1975, the five founding nations were joined by Qatar (1961), Indonesia (1962–2008, rejoined 2014–2016), Libya (1962), United Arab Emirates (originally just the Emirate of Abu Dhabi, 1967), Algeria (1969), Nigeria (1971), Ecuador (1973–1992, 2007–2020), and Gabon (1975–1994, rejoined 2016). By the early 1970s, OPEC's membership accounted for more than half of worldwide oil production.

In 2006, indicating that OPEC is not averse to further expansion, Mohammed Barkindo, OPEC's acting secretary general, urged his African neighbors Angola and Sudan to join. Angola joined in 2007, followed by Equatorial Guinea in 2017. Since the 1980s, representatives from Canada, Egypt, Mexico, Norway, Oman, Russia, and other oil-exporting nations have attended many OPEC meetings as observers, as an informal mechanism for coordinating policies.

=== 1973–1974: Oil embargo ===
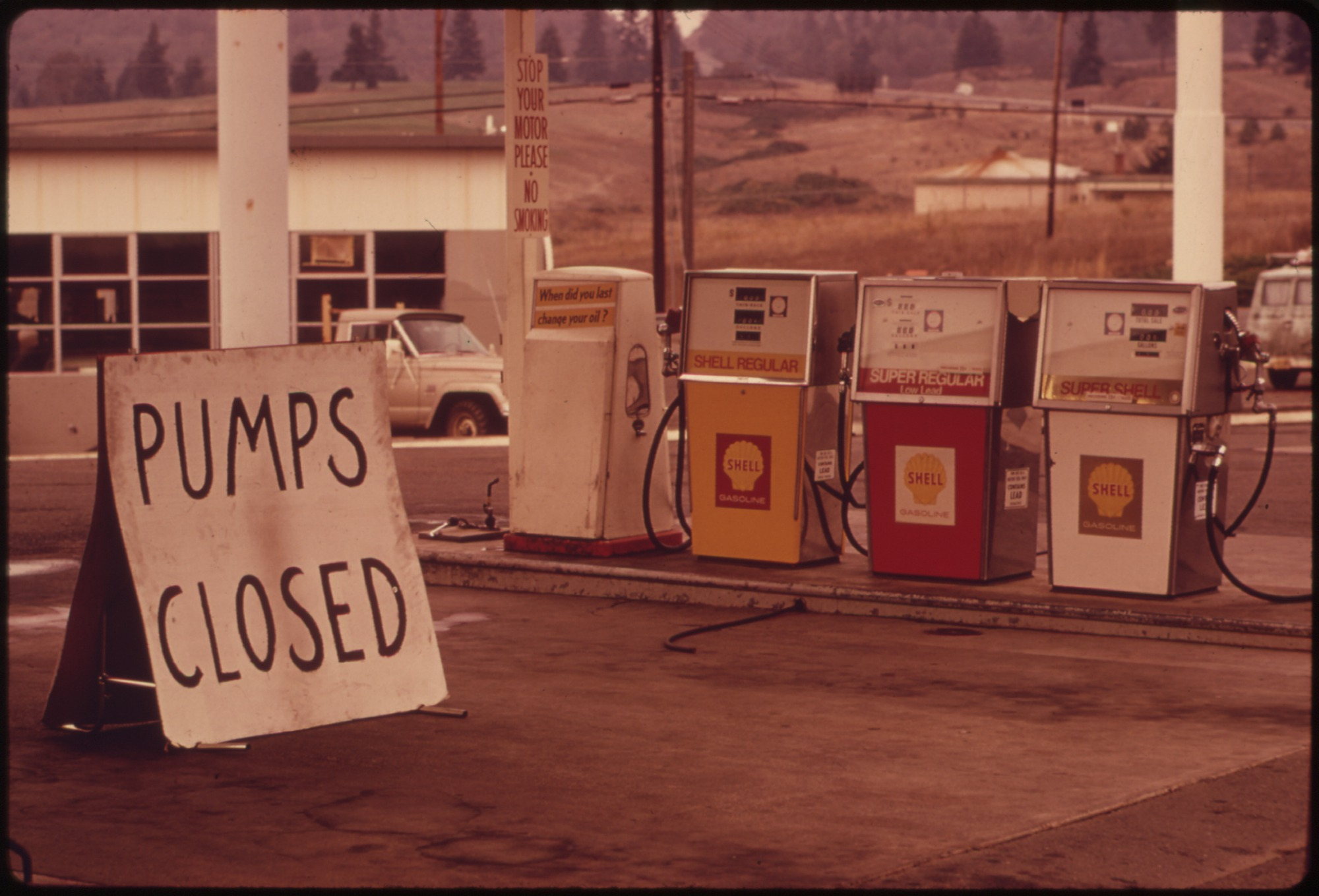
An undersupplied US gasoline station, closed during the oil embargo in 1973

The oil market was tight in the early 1970s, which reduced the risks for OPEC members in nationalising their oil production. One of the major fears for OPEC members was that nationalisation would cause a steep decline in the price of oil. This prompted a wave of nationalisations in countries such as Libya, Algeria, Iraq, Nigeria, Saudi Arabia and Venezuela. With greater control over oil production decisions and amid high oil prices, OPEC members unilaterally raised oil prices in 1973, prompting the 1973 oil crisis.

In October 1973, the Organization of Arab Petroleum Exporting Countries (OAPEC, consisting of the Arab majority of OPEC plus Egypt and Syria) declared significant production cuts and an oil embargo against the United States and other industrialized nations that supported Israel in the Yom Kippur War. A previous embargo attempt was largely ineffective in response to the Six-Day War in 1967. In 1973, the result was a sharp rise in oil prices and OPEC revenues, from US$3/bbl to US$12/bbl, and an emergency period of energy rationing, intensified by panic reactions, a declining trend in US oil production, currency devaluations, and a lengthy UK coal-miners dispute.

For a time, the UK imposed an emergency three-day workweek. Seven European nations banned non-essential Sunday driving. US gas stations limited the amount of petrol that could be dispensed, closed on Sundays, and restricted the days when petrol could be purchased, based on number plate numbers.

Even after the embargo ended in March 1974, following intense diplomatic activity, prices continued to rise. The world experienced a global economic recession, with unemployment and inflation surging simultaneously, steep declines in stock and bond prices, major shifts in trade balances and petrodollar flows, and a dramatic end to the post-WWII economic boom.

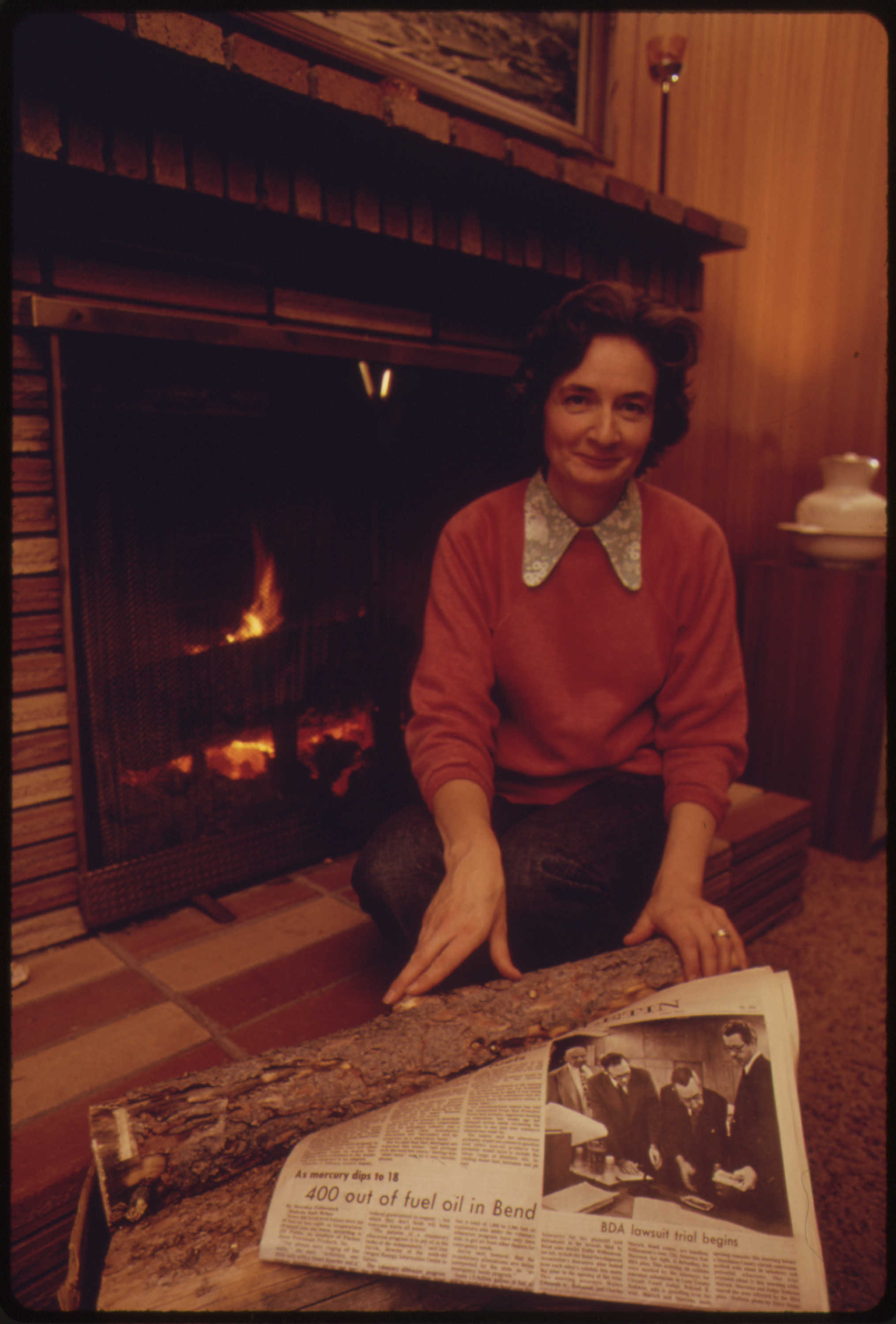
A woman uses wood in a fireplace for heat. A newspaper headline in the foreground shows a story regarding a lack of heating oil in the community.

The 1973–1974 oil embargo had lasting effects on the United States and other industrialized nations, which established the International Energy Agency in response, as well as national emergency stockpiles designed to withstand months of future supply disruptions. Oil conservation efforts included lower speed limits on highways, smaller and more energy-efficient cars and appliances, year-round daylight saving time, reduced usage of heating and air-conditioning, better building insulation, increased support of mass transit, and greater emphasis on coal, natural gas, ethanol, nuclear and other alternative energy sources.

These long-term efforts became effective enough that US oil consumption rose only 11 percent during 1980–2014, while real GDP rose 150 percent. In the 1970s, OPEC nations demonstrated convincingly that their oil could be used as both a political and economic weapon against other nations, at least in the short term.

The embargo also meant that a section of the Non-Aligned Movement saw power as a source of hope for their developing countries. The Algerian president Houari Boumédiène expressed this hope in a speech at the UN's sixth Special Session, in April 1974:

The OPEC action is really the first illustration and at the same time the most concrete and most spectacular illustration of the importance of raw material prices for our countries, the vital need for the producing countries to operate the levers of price control, and lastly, the great possibilities of a union of raw material producing countries. This action should be viewed by the developing countries as an example and a source of hope.

=== 1975–1980: Special Fund, now the OPEC Fund for International Development ===
OPEC's international aid activities date from well before the 1973–1974 oil price surge. For example, the Kuwait Fund for Arab Economic Development has operated since 1961.

In the years after 1973, as an example of so-called "checkbook diplomacy", certain Arab nations have been among the world's largest providers of foreign aid, and OPEC added to its goals the selling of oil for the socio-economic growth of poorer nations. The OPEC Special Fund was conceived in Algiers, Algeria, in March 1975, and was established in January 1976.

"A Solemn Declaration 'reaffirmed the natural solidarity which unites OPEC countries with other developing countries in their struggle to overcome underdevelopment,' and called for measures to strengthen cooperation between these countries... [The OPEC Special Fund's] resources are additional to those already made available by OPEC states through a number of bilateral and multilateral channels." The Fund became an official international development agency in May 1980 and was renamed the OPEC Fund for International Development, with Permanent Observer status at the United Nations. In 2020, the institution ceased using the abbreviation OFID.

=== 1975: Hostage siege ===
On 21 December 1975, Saudi Arabia's Ahmed Zaki Yamani, Iran's Jamshid Amuzegar, and the other OPEC oil ministers were taken hostage at their semi-annual conference in Vienna, Austria. The attack, which killed three non-ministers, was orchestrated by a six-person team led by Venezuelan terrorist "Carlos the Jackal", and which included Gabriele Kröcher-Tiedemann and Hans-Joachim Klein. The self-named "Arm of the Arab Revolution" group declared its goal to be the liberation of Palestine. Carlos planned to take over the conference by force and hold for ransom all eleven attending oil ministers, except for Yamani and Amuzegar who were to be executed.

Carlos arranged bus and plane travel for his team and 42 of the original 63 hostages, with stops in Algiers and Tripoli, planning to fly eventually to Baghdad, where Yamani and Amuzegar were to be killed. All 30 non-Arab hostages were released in Algiers, excluding Amuzegar. Additional hostages were released at another stop in Tripoli before returning to Algiers. With only 10 hostages remaining, Carlos held a phone conversation with Algerian president Houari Boumédiène, who informed Carlos that the oil ministers' deaths would result in an attack on the plane. Boumédiene must also have offered Carlos asylum at this time and possibly financial compensation for failing to complete his assignment. Carlos expressed his regret at not being able to murder Yamani and Amuzegar, then he and his comrades left the plane. All the hostages and terrorists walked away from the situation, two days after it began.

Sometime after the attack, Carlos's accomplices revealed that the operation was commanded by Wadie Haddad, a founder of the Popular Front for the Liberation of Palestine. They also claimed that the idea and funding came from an Arab president, widely thought to be Muammar Gaddafi of Libya, itself an OPEC member. Fellow militants Bassam Abu Sharif and Klein claimed that Carlos received and kept a ransom between $20 million and US$50 million from "an Arab president". Carlos claimed that Saudi Arabia paid ransom on behalf of Iran, but that the money was "diverted en route and lost by the Revolution". He was finally captured in 1994 and is serving life sentences for at least 16 other murders.

=== 1979–1980: Oil crisis and 1980s oil glut ===
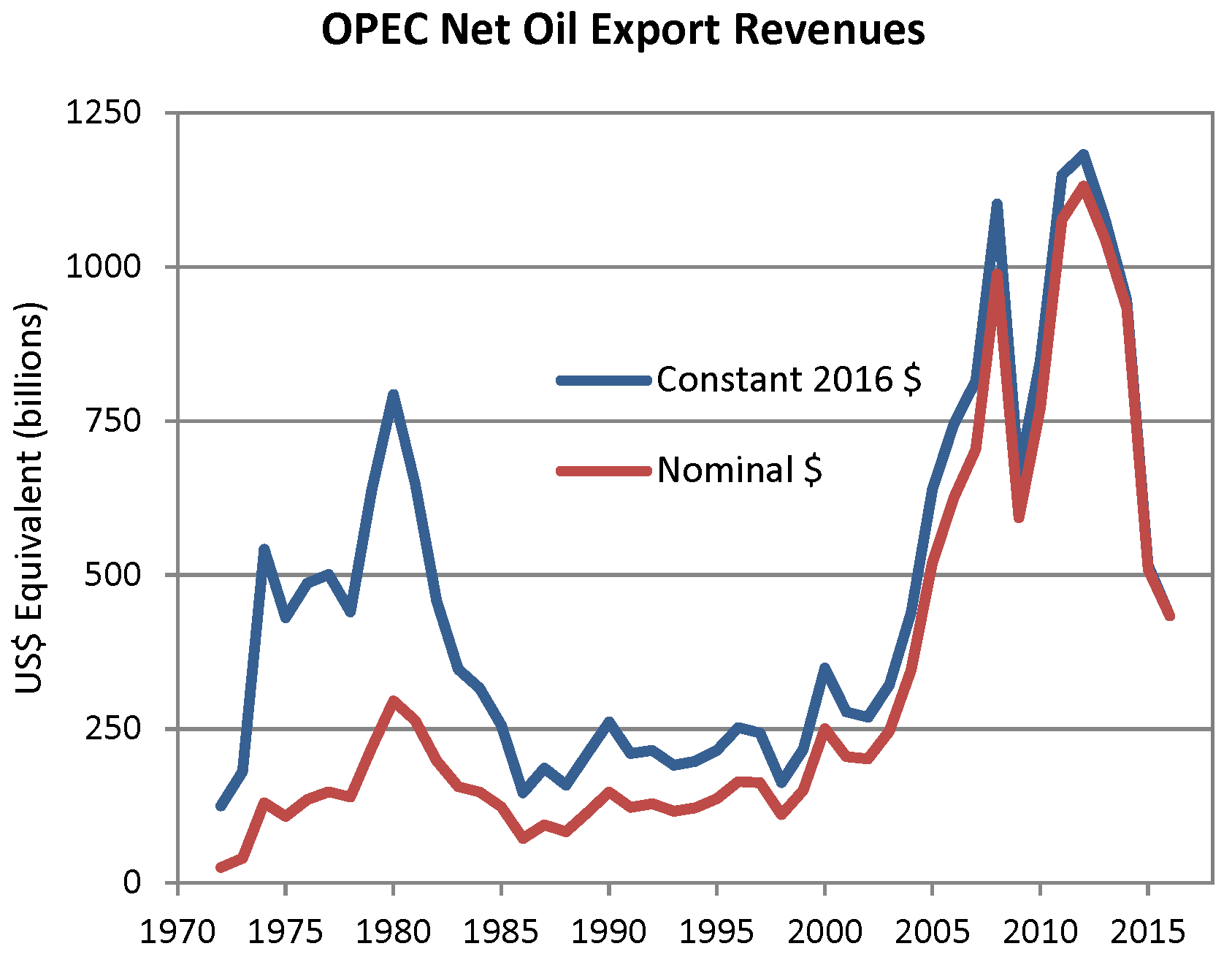
Fluctuations of OPEC net oil export revenues from 1972 to 2017.

In response to a wave of oil nationalizations and the high prices of the 1970s, industrial nations took steps to reduce their dependence on OPEC oil, especially after prices reached new peaks approaching US$40/bbl in 1979–1980 when the Iranian Revolution and Iran–Iraq War disrupted regional stability and oil supplies. Electric utilities worldwide switched from oil to coal, natural gas, or nuclear power; national governments initiated multibillion-dollar research programs to develop alternatives to oil; and commercial exploration developed major non-OPEC oilfields in Siberia, Alaska, the North Sea, and the Gulf of Mexico.

By 1986, daily worldwide demand for oil dropped by 5 million barrels, non-OPEC production rose by an even-larger amount, and OPEC's market share sank from approximately 50 percent in 1979 to less than 30 percent in 1985. Illustrating the volatile multi-year timeframes of typical market cycles for natural resources, the result was a six-year decline in the price of oil, which culminated by plunging more than half in 1986 alone. As one oil analyst summarized succinctly: "When the price of something as essential as oil spikes, humanity does two things: finds more of it and finds ways to use less of it."

To combat falling revenue from oil sales, in 1982 Saudi Arabia pressed OPEC for audited national production quotas in an attempt to limit output and boost prices. When other OPEC nations failed to comply, Saudi Arabia first slashed its own production from 10 million barrels daily in 1979–1981 to just one-third of that level in 1985. When even this proved ineffective, Saudi Arabia reversed course and flooded the market with cheap oil, causing prices to fall below US$10/bbl and higher-cost producers to become unprofitable.

These strategic measures by Saudi Arabia to regulate oil prices had profound economic repercussions. As the swing producer in that period, the Kingdom faced significant economic strain. Its revenues dramatically decreased from $119 billion in 1981 to $26 billion by 1985, leading to substantial budget deficits and a doubling of its debt, reaching 100% of the Gross Domestic Product.

Faced with increasing economic hardship (which ultimately contributed to the collapse of the Soviet bloc in 1989), the "free-riding" oil exporters that had previously failed to comply with OPEC agreements finally began to limit production to shore up prices, based on painstakingly negotiated national quotas that sought to balance oil-related and economic criteria since 1986. (Within their sovereign-controlled territories, the national governments of OPEC members are able to impose production limits on both government-owned and private oil companies.) Generally when OPEC production targets are reduced, oil prices increase.

=== 1990–2003: Ample supply and modest disruptions ===
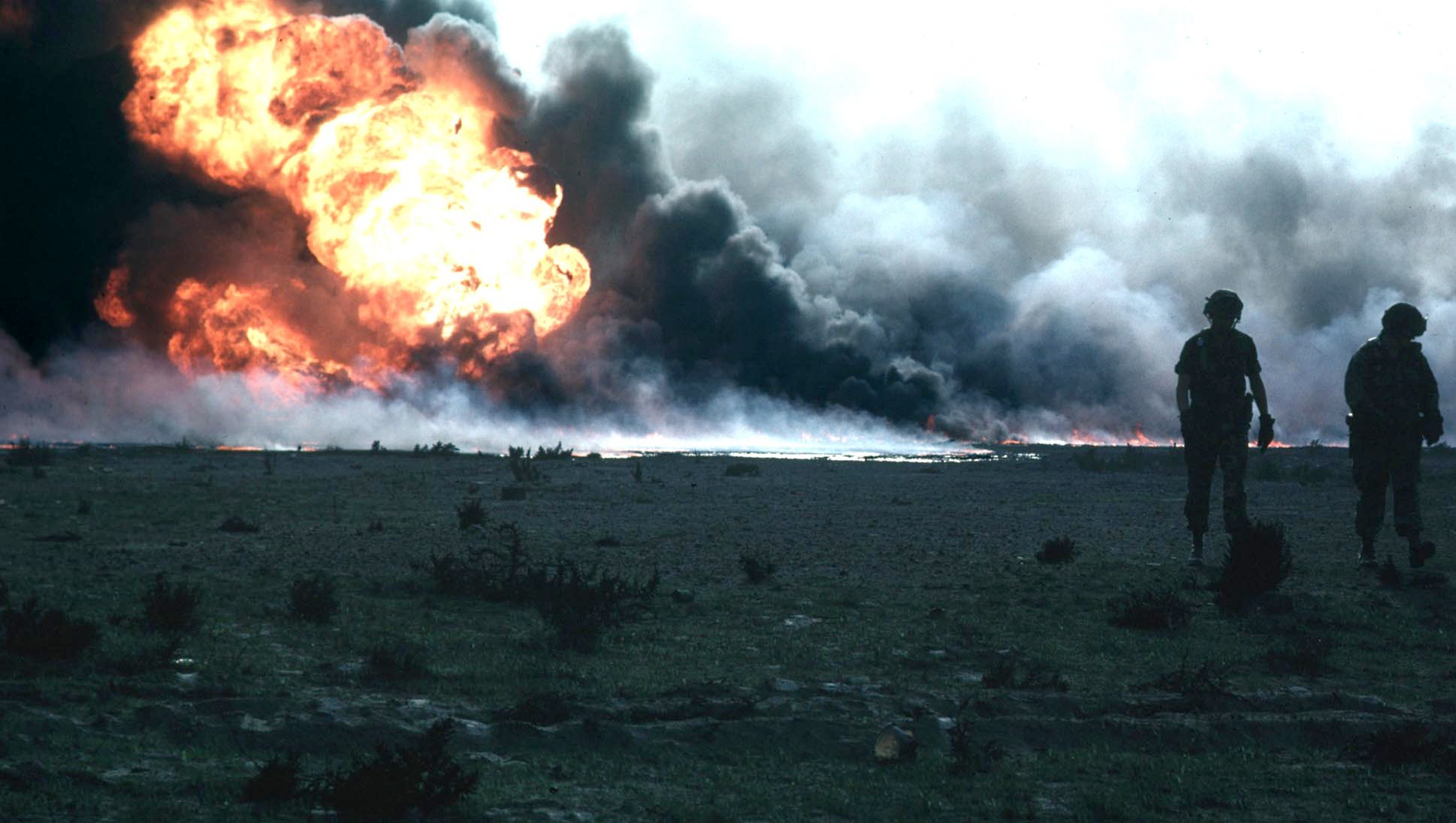
One of the hundreds of Kuwaiti oil fires set by retreating Iraqi troops in 1991.

Fluctuations of Brent crude oil price, 1988–2015.

Leading up to his August 1990 Invasion of Kuwait, Iraqi President Saddam Hussein was pushing OPEC to end overproduction and to send oil prices higher, in order to help OPEC members financially and to accelerate rebuilding from the 1980–1988 Iran–Iraq War. But these two Iraqi wars against fellow OPEC founders marked a low point in the cohesion of the organization, and oil prices subsided quickly after the short-term supply disruptions. The September 2001 Al Qaeda attacks on the US and the March 2003 US invasion of Iraq had even milder short-term impacts on oil prices, as Saudi Arabia and other exporters again cooperated to keep the world adequately supplied.

In the 1990s, OPEC lost its two newest members, who had joined in the mid-1970s. Ecuador withdrew in December 1992, because it was unwilling to pay the annual US$2 million membership fee and felt that it needed to produce more oil than it was allowed under the OPEC quota, although it rejoined in October 2007. Similar concerns prompted Gabon to suspend membership in January 1995; it rejoined in July 2016. Iraq has remained a member of OPEC since the organization's founding, but Iraqi production was not a part of OPEC quota agreements from 1998 to 2016, due to the country's daunting political difficulties.

Lower demand triggered by the 1997–1998 Asian financial crisis saw the price of oil fall back to 1986 levels. After oil slumped to around US$10/bbl, joint diplomacy achieved a gradual slowing of oil production by OPEC, Mexico and Norway. After prices slumped again in Nov. 2001, OPEC, Norway, Mexico, Russia, Oman and Angola agreed to cut production on 1 January 2002 for 6 months. OPEC contributed 1.5 million barrels a day (mbpd) to the approximately 2 mbpd of cuts announced.

In June 2003, the International Energy Agency (IEA) and OPEC held their first joint workshop on energy issues. They have continued to meet regularly since then, "to collectively better understand trends, analysis and viewpoints and advance market transparency and predictability."

=== 2003–2011: Volatility ===
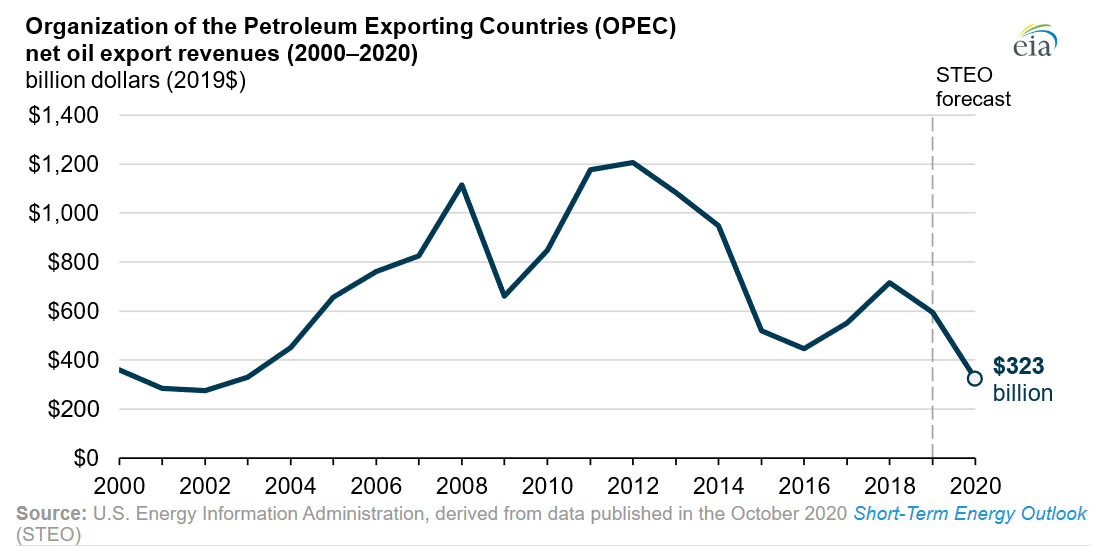
OPEC members' net oil export revenues, 2000–2020

Widespread insurgency and sabotage occurred during the 2003–2008 height of the American occupation of Iraq, coinciding with rapidly increasing oil demand from China and commodity-hungry investors, recurring violence against the Nigerian oil industry, and dwindling spare capacity as a cushion against potential shortages. This combination of forces prompted a sharp rise in oil prices to levels far higher than those previously targeted by OPEC. Price volatility reached an extreme in 2008, as WTI crude oil surged to a record US$147/bbl in July and then plunged back to US$32/bbl in December, during the worst global recession since World War II.

OPEC's annual oil export revenue also set a new record in 2008, estimated around US$1 trillion, and reached similar annual rates in 2011–2014 (along with extensive petrodollar recycling activity) before plunging again. By the time of the 2011 Libyan Civil War and Arab Spring, OPEC started issuing explicit statements to counter "excessive speculation" in oil futures markets, blaming financial speculators for increasing volatility beyond market fundamentals.

In May 2008, Indonesia announced that it would leave OPEC when its membership expired at the end of that year, having become a net importer of oil and being unable to meet its production quota. A statement released by OPEC on 10 September 2008 confirmed Indonesia's withdrawal, noting that OPEC "regretfully accepted the wish of Indonesia to suspend its full membership in the organization, and recorded its hope that the country would be in a position to rejoin the organization in the not-too-distant future."

=== 2008: Production dispute ===
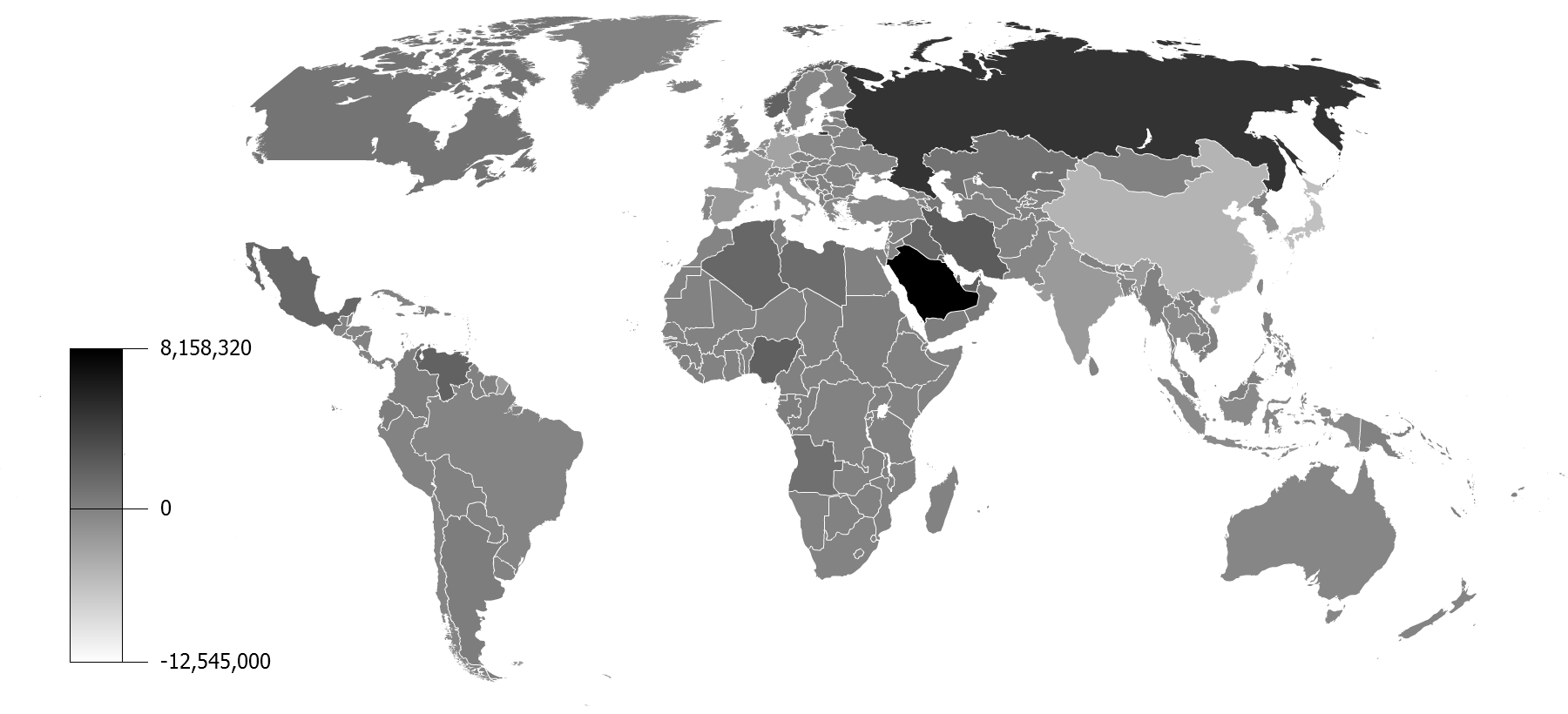
Countries by net oil exports, 2008

The differing economic needs of OPEC member states often affect the internal debates behind OPEC production quotas. Poorer members have pushed for production cuts from fellow members, to increase the price of oil and thus their own revenues. These proposals conflict with Saudi Arabia's stated long-term strategy of being a partner with the world's economic powers to ensure a steady flow of oil that would support economic expansion.

Part of the basis for this policy is the Saudi concern that overly expensive oil or unreliable supply will drive industrial nations to conserve energy and develop alternative fuels, curtailing the worldwide demand for oil and eventually leaving unneeded barrels in the ground. To this point, Saudi Oil Minister Yamani famously remarked in 1973: "The Stone Age didn't end because we ran out of stones."

To elucidate Saudi Arabia's contemporary approach, in 2024, Saudi Energy Minister Prince Abdulaziz bin Salman articulated a stance that reflects how the kingdom has adapted to the evolving economic needs within OPEC and the broader international community. Emphasizing the need for a balanced and fair global energy transition, he highlighted the importance of diversifying energy sources and noted significant investments in natural gas, petrochemicals, and renewables. These efforts support economic development in emerging countries and align with global climate objectives.

He addressed shifting energy security concerns, stating, "Energy security in the 70s, 80s, and 90s was more dependent on oil. Now, you get what happened last year... It was gas. The future problem on energy security will not be oil. It will be renewables. And the materials, and the mines."

On 10 September 2008, with oil prices still near US$100/bbl, a production dispute occurred when the Saudis reportedly walked out of a negotiating session where rival members voted to reduce OPEC output. Although Saudi delegates officially endorsed the new quotas, they stated anonymously that they would not observe them. The New York Times quoted one such delegate as saying: "Saudi Arabia will meet the market's demand. We will see what the market requires and we will not leave a customer without oil. The policy has not changed." Over the next few months, oil prices plummeted into the $30s, and did not return to $100 until the Libyan Civil War in 2011.

=== 2014–2017: Oil glut ===
Countries by oil production, 2013

Top oil-producing countries, thousand barrels per day, 1973–2016 View source data.

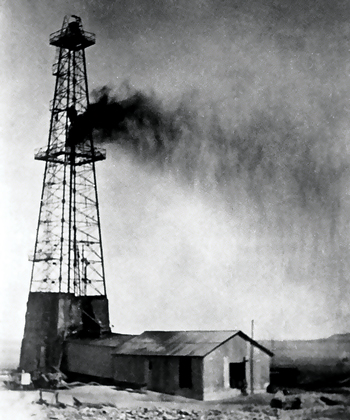
A gusher well in Saudi Arabia, the conventional source of OPEC production

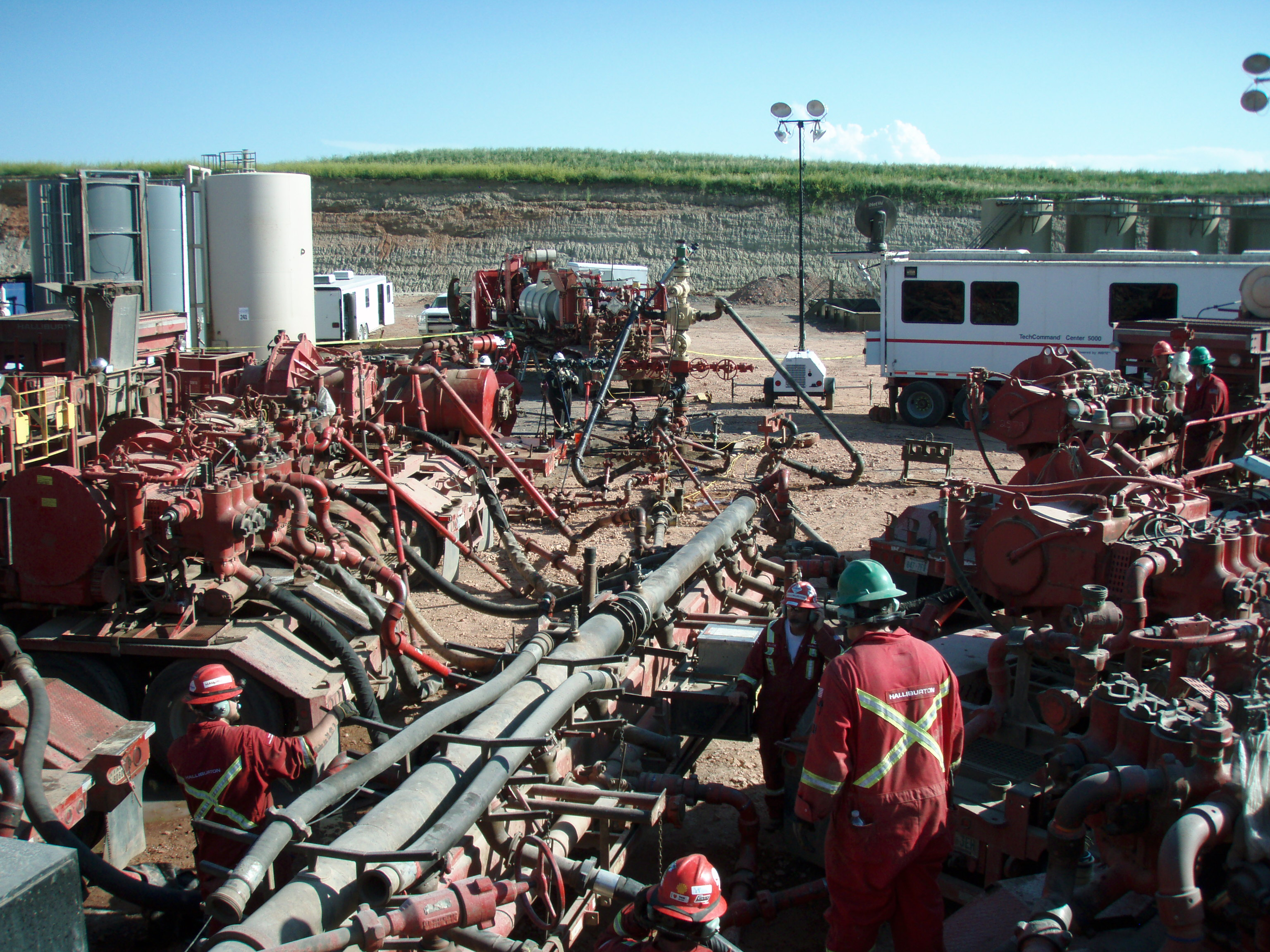
Shale "fracking" in the US, an important new challenge to OPEC market share

During 2014–2015, OPEC members consistently exceeded their production ceiling, and China experienced a slowdown in economic growth. At the same time, US oil production nearly doubled from 2008 levels and approached the world-leading "swing producer" volumes of Saudi Arabia and Russia, due to the substantial long-term improvement and spread of shale "fracking" technology in response to the years of record oil prices. These developments led to a plunge in US oil import requirements (moving closer to energy independence), a record volume of worldwide oil inventories, and a collapse in oil prices that continued into early 2016.

In spite of global oversupply, on 27 November 2014 in Vienna, Saudi oil minister Ali Al-Naimi blocked appeals from poorer OPEC members for production cuts to support prices. Naimi argued that the oil market should be left to rebalance itself competitively at lower price levels, strategically rebuilding OPEC's long-term market share by ending the profitability of high-cost US shale oil production. As he explained in an interview:

Is it reasonable for a highly efficient producer to reduce output, while the producer of poor efficiency continues to produce? That is crooked logic. If I reduce, what happens to my market share? The price will go up and the Russians, the Brazilians, US shale oil producers will take my share... We want to tell the world that high-efficiency producing countries are the ones that deserve market share. That is the operative principle in all capitalist countries... One thing is for sure: Current prices [roughly US$60/bbl] do not support all producers.

When OPEC met in Vienna on 4 December 2015, the organization had exceeded its production ceiling for 18 consecutive months, US oil production had declined only slightly from its peak, world markets appeared to be oversupplied by at least 2 million barrels per day despite war-torn Libya pumping 1 million barrels below capacity, oil producers were making major adjustments to withstand prices as low as $40, Indonesia was rejoining the export organization, and Iraqi production had surged after years of disorder.

Iranian output was poised to rebound with the lifting of international sanctions, hundreds of world leaders at the Paris Climate Agreement were committing to limit carbon emissions from fossil fuels, and solar technologies were becoming steadily more competitive and prevalent. In light of all these market pressures, OPEC decided to set aside its ineffective production ceiling until the next ministerial conference in June 2016.

By 20 January 2016, the OPEC Reference Basket was down to US$22.48/bbl – less than one-fourth of its high from June 2014 ($110.48), less than one-sixth of its record from July 2008 ($140.73), and back below the April 2003 starting point ($23.27) of its historic run-up.

As 2016 continued, the oil glut was partially trimmed with significant production offline in the United States, Canada, Libya, Nigeria and China, and the basket price gradually rose back into the $40s. OPEC regained a modest percentage of market share, saw the cancellation of many competing drilling projects, maintained the status quo at its June conference, and endorsed "prices at levels that are suitable for both producers and consumers", although many producers were still experiencing serious economic difficulties.

=== 2017–2020: Production cut and OPEC+ ===
As OPEC members grew weary of a multi-year supply contest with diminishing returns and shrinking financial reserves, the organization finally attempted its first production cut since 2008. Despite many political obstacles, a September 2016 decision to trim approximately one million barrels per day was codified by a new quota agreement at the November 2016 OPEC conference. The agreement, which exempted disruption-ridden members Libya and Nigeria, covered the first half of 2017—alongside promised reductions from Russia and ten other non-members, offset by expected increases in the US shale sector, Libya, Nigeria, spare capacity, and surging late-2016 OPEC production before the cuts took effect.

Indonesia announced another "temporary suspension" of its OPEC membership rather than accepting the organization's requested five-percent production cut. Prices fluctuated around US$50/bbl, and in May 2017, OPEC decided to extend the new quotas through March 2018, with the world waiting to see if and how the oil inventory glut might be fully siphoned off by then. Longtime oil analyst Daniel Yergin "described the relationship between OPEC and shale as 'mutual coexistence', with both sides learning to live with prices that are lower than they would like". These production cut deals with non-OPEC countries are generally referred to as "OPEC+".

In December 2017, Russia and OPEC agreed to extend the production cut of 1.8 mbpd until the end of 2018.

Qatar announced it would withdraw from OPEC effective 1 January 2019. According to The New York Times, this was a strategic response to the Qatar diplomatic crisis, which also involved Saudi Arabia, the UAE, Bahrain, and Egypt.

On 29 June 2019, Russia again agreed with Saudi Arabia to extend by six to nine months the original production cuts of 2018.

In October 2019, Ecuador announced it would withdraw from OPEC on 1 January 2020, due to financial problems facing the country.

In December 2019, OPEC and Russia agreed on one of the deepest output cuts so far to prevent oversupply in a deal that would last for the first three months of 2020.

=== 2020: Saudi-Russian price war ===
In early March 2020, OPEC officials presented an ultimatum to Russia to cut production by 1.5% of world supply. Russia, which foresaw continuing cuts as American shale oil production increased, rejected the demand, ending the three-year partnership between OPEC and major non-OPEC providers. Another factor was weakening global demand resulting from the COVID-19 pandemic. This also resulted in 'OPEC plus' failing to extend the agreement cutting 2.1 million barrels per day that was set to expire at the end of March. Saudi Arabia, which has absorbed a disproportionate amount of the cuts to convince Russia to stay in the agreement, notified its buyers on 7 March that they would raise output and discount their oil in April. This prompted a Brent crude price crash of more than 30% before a slight recovery and widespread turmoil in financial markets.

Several pundits saw this as a Saudi-Russian price war, or game of chicken which cause the "other side to blink first". Saudi Arabia had in March 2020 $500 billion of foreign exchange reserves, while at that time Russia's reserves were $580 billion. The debt-to-GDP ratio of the Saudis was 25%, while the Russian ratio was 15%. Another remarked that the Saudis can produce oil at as low a price as $3 per barrel, whereas Russia needs $30 per barrel to cover production costs. "To Russia, this price war is more than just about regaining market share for oil," one analyst claims. "It's about assaulting the Western economy, especially America's."

In order to ward off the oil exporters price war which can make shale oil production uneconomical, US may protect its crude oil market share by passing the NOPEC bill. Meanwhile, Saudi Arabia, represented by Energy Minister Prince Abdulaziz bin Salman, maintains a conciliatory stance towards the U.S. shale industry. He clarified that harming this sector was never their intention, stating, "I made it clear that it was not on our radar or our intention to create any type of damage to their industry... they will rise again from the ashes and thrive and prosper." He also noted that Saudi Arabia is looking forward to a time when U.S. producers thrive once again in a market with higher oil demand."

In April 2020, OPEC and a group of other oil producers, including Russia, agreed to extend production cuts until the end of July. The cartel and its allies agreed to cut oil production in May and June by 9.7 million barrels a day, equal to around 10% of global output, in an effort to prop up prices, which had previously fallen to record lows.

=== 2021: Saudi-Emirati dispute ===
In July 2021, OPEC+ member United Arab Emirates rejected a Saudi proposed eight-month extension to oil output curbs which was in place due to COVID-19 and lower oil consumption. The previous year, OPEC+ cut the equivalent of about 10% of demand at the time. The UAE asked for the maximum amount of oil the group would recognize the country of producing to be raised to 3.8 million barrels a day compared to its previous 3.2 million barrels. A compromise deal allowed UAE to increase its maximum oil output to 3.65 million barrels a day.

Under the terms of the agreement, Russia would increase its production from 11 million barrels to 11.5 million by May 2022 as well. All members would increase output by 400,000 barrels per day each month starting in August to gradually offset the previous cuts made due to the COVID pandemic.

This compromise, achieved where Saudi Arabia met the United Arab Emirates halfway, underscored OPEC+ unity. UAE Energy Minister Suhail Al-Mazrouei thanked Saudi Arabia and Russia for facilitating dialogue leading to an agreement. He stated, "The UAE is committed to this group and will always work with it." On the Saudi side, Energy Minister Prince Abdulaziz bin Salman emphasized consensus building and stated that the agreement strengthens OPEC+'s ties and ensures its continuity.

=== 2021–2023: Global energy crisis ===
The record-high energy prices were driven by a global surge in demand as the world quit the economic recession caused by COVID-19, particularly due to strong energy demand in Asia. In August 2021, U.S. President Joe Biden's national security adviser Jake Sullivan released a statement calling on OPEC+ to boost oil production to "offset previous production cuts that OPEC+ imposed during the pandemic until well into 2022." On 28 September 2021, Sullivan met in Saudi Arabia with Saudi Crown Prince Mohammed bin Salman to discuss the high oil prices. The price of oil was about US$80 by October 2021, the highest since 2014. President Joe Biden and U.S. Energy Secretary Jennifer Granholm blamed the OPEC+ for rising oil and gas prices.

Russia's invasion of Ukraine in February 2022 has altered the global oil trade. EU leaders tried to ban the majority of Russian crude imports, but even prior to the official action imports to Northwest Europe were down. More Russian oil is now sold outside of Europe, more specifically to India and China.

In October 2022, key OPEC+ ministers agreed to oil production cuts of 2 million barrels per day, the first production cut since 2020. This led to renewed interest in the passage of NOPEC.

=== 2022: Oil production cut ===
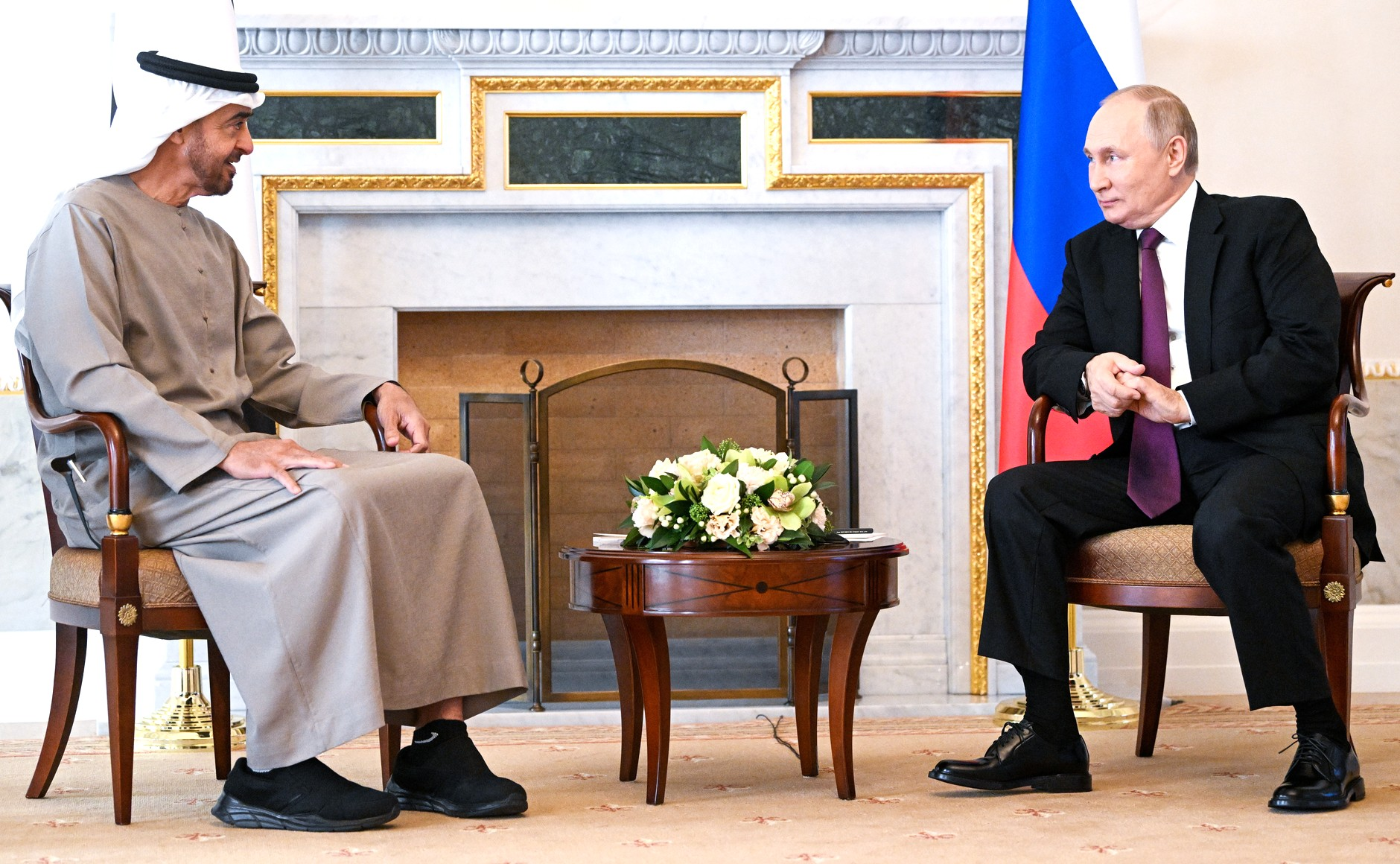
UAE's President Mohamed bin Zayed Al Nahyan with Russian president Vladimir Putin, days after OPEC+ cut oil production, 11 October 2022

In October 2022, OPEC+ led by Saudi Arabia announced a large cut to its oil output target in order to aid Russia. In response, US President Joe Biden vowed "consequences" and said the US government would "re-evaluate" the longstanding U.S. relationship with Saudi Arabia. Robert Menendez, the Democratic chairman of the U.S. Senate Foreign Relations Committee, called for a freeze on cooperation with and arms sales to Saudi Arabia, accusing the kingdom of helping Russia underwrite its war with Ukraine.

Saudi Arabia's foreign ministry stated that the OPEC+ decision was "purely economic" and taken unanimously by all members of the conglomerate, pushing back on pressure to change its stance on the Russo-Ukrainian War at the UN. In response, the White House accused Saudi Arabia of pressuring other OPEC nations into agreeing with the production cut, some of which felt coerced, saying the United States had presented the Saudi government with an analysis showing there was no market basis for the cut. United States National Security Council spokesman John Kirby said the Saudi government knew the decision will "increase Russian revenues and blunt the effectiveness of sanctions" against Moscow, rejecting the Saudi claim that the move was "purely economic".

According to a report in The Intercept, sources and experts said that Saudi Arabia had sought even deeper cuts than Russia, saying Saudi Crown Prince Mohammed bin Salman wanted to sway the 2022 United States elections in favor of the GOP and the 2024 United States presidential election in favor of Donald Trump. In contrast, Saudi officials maintain that their decision to reduce oil production was driven by concerns over the global economy, not political motivations. They state that the cuts were a response to the global economic situation and low inventories, which could trigger a rally in oil prices. Saudi Arabia affirms its actions by emphasizing its strategic partnership with the U.S., focusing on peace, security, and prosperity.

In 2023, the IEA predicted that demand for fossil fuels such as oil, natural gas and coal would reach an all-time high by 2030. OPEC rejected the IEA's forecast, saying "what makes such predictions so dangerous, is that they are often accompanied by calls to stop investing in new oil and gas projects."

In November 2024, S&P Global alleged that the UAE ignored the OPEC's oil production cuts and produced around 700,000 barrels more than the agreed quota, that is, 2.91m barrels per day. Analysts asserted that the Emirates' "quota busting" would underestimate Saudi and Russia's efforts to increase oil prices by cutting production. While Russia was seeking to fund its war with Ukraine, Saudi had its own plans of diversifying the economy.

=== 2025–2026: Production increases and the Iran War ===
In 2025, OPEC+ began the process of reversing voluntary production cuts. As of September 2025, the group had already cuts of about 2.5 million barrels per day—equivalent to ~2.4% of global demand. OPEC+ announced it would continue to reverse cuts and said it would boost production by 137,000 barrels per day in October.

As the U.S. and Israel began attacks on Iran in March 2026, OPEC agreed to raise production by about 200,000 barrels to help buffer potential disruptions from the attacks, with Saudi Arabia having already increased its production the month prior. As the Iran war persisted with Iran taking steps to block the Strait of Hormuz, preventing oil tankers from leaving the Persian Gulf, some OPEC countries like Kuwait had to cut back production. Ongoing conflict and attacks from Iran on the neighboring countries also affected production by mid-April, with individual national production falling between 23% and 61% for each nation.

The UAE, the third-largest producer in OPEC at the time, announced it was withdrawing from OPEC and OPEC+ in effective May 1, 2026. The UAE stated it would be able to increase oil production outside of the OPEC controls, an option discussed in previous years. A The Arab Gulf States Institute analyst described it as a "declaration of independence" from institutions not aligned with Emirati interests, and a rejection of Saudi influence. The New York Times connected it to an increasing divergence between Emirati foreign policy and that of its neighbors.

In June 2026, reports emerged that Iraq was considering withdrawing from OPEC unless the group agreed on higher oil production quotas.

== Membership ==
=== Current member countries ===
As of May 2026, OPEC has 11 member countries: four in the Middle East (West Asia), six in Africa, and one in South America. According to the U.S. Energy Information Administration (EIA), OPEC's combined rate of oil production (including gas condensate) represented 44% of the world's total in 2016, and OPEC accounted for 81.5% of the world's "proven" oil reserves. Subsequent reports from 2022 indicate that OPEC member countries were then responsible for about 38% of total world crude oil production. It is estimated that these countries hold 79.5% of the globe's proven oil reserves, with the Middle East accounting for 67.2% of OPEC's reserves.

Approval of a new member country requires agreement by three-quarters of OPEC's existing members, including all five of the founders. In October 2015, Sudan formally submitted an application to join, but it is not yet a member.

Country	Region	Duration of membership	Population (2022)	Area (km^{2})	Oil production (bbl/day, 2023) (Note: One petroleum barrel (bbl) is approximately 42 U.S. gallons, or 159 liters, or 0.159 m^{3}, varying slightly with temperature. To put the production numbers in context, a supertanker typically holds 2,000,000 barrels (320,000 m^{3}), and the world's current production rate would take approximately 56 years to exhaust the world's current proven reserves.)	Proven reserves (bbl, 2022)
Algeria	North Africa	Since 1969	44,903,220	2,381,740	1,183,096	12,200,000,000
Republic of the Congo	Central Africa	Since 2018	5,970,000	342,000	261,986	1,810,000,000
Equatorial Guinea	Central Africa	Since 2017	1,674,910	28,050	88,126	1,100,000,000
Gabon	Central Africa	1975–1995, Since 2016	2,388,990	267,667	204,273	2,000,000,000
Iran	Middle East	Since 1960 (Note: The five founding members attended the first OPEC conference in September 1960.)	88,550,570	1,648,195	3,623,455	208,600,000,000
Iraq	Middle East	Since 1960	44,496,120	437,072	4,341,410	145,020,000,000
Kuwait	Middle East	Since 1960	4,268,870	17,820	2,709,958	101,500,000,000
Libya	North Africa	Since 1962	6,812,340	1,759,540	1,225,430	48,360,000,000
Nigeria	West Africa	Since 1971	218,541,210	923,768	1,441,674	36,970,000,000
Saudi Arabia	Middle East	Since 1960	36,408,820	2,149,690	9,733,479	267,190,000,000
Venezuela	South America	Since 1960	28,301,700	916,445	750,506	303,220,000,000
OPEC total			491,757,880	10,955,392	28,956,906	1,240,970,000,000
World total			7,951,150,000	510,072,000	81,803,545	1,564,441,000,000
OPEC percent			6.18%	2.14%	35.39%	79%

=== OPEC+ ===
A number of non-OPEC member countries also participate in the organisation's initiatives such as voluntary supply cuts in order to further bind policy objectives between OPEC and non-OPEC members. This loose grouping of countries, known as OPEC+, includes Azerbaijan, Bahrain, Brunei, Brazil, Kazakhstan, Malaysia, Mexico, Oman, Russia, South Sudan and Sudan.

The collaboration among OPEC+ member countries has led to the establishment of the Declaration of Cooperation (DoC) in 2017, which has been extended multiple times due to its remarkable success. The DoC serves as a framework for cooperation and coordination between OPEC and non-OPEC countries. OPEC+ members engage in further cooperative efforts through the Charter of Cooperation (CoC), which provides a platform for long-term collaboration. The CoC facilitates dialogue and the exchange of views on global oil and energy market conditions, with the overarching goal of ensuring a secure energy supply and fostering lasting stability that benefits producers, consumers, investors, and the global economy.

=== Observers ===
Since the 1980s, representatives from Canada, Egypt, Mexico, Norway, Oman, Russia, and other oil-exporting nations have attended many OPEC meetings as observers. This arrangement serves as an informal mechanism for coordinating policies.

=== Former members ===
Country	Region	Membership years	Population (2022)	Area (km^{2})	Oil production (bbl/day, 2023)	Proven reserves (2022)
Angola	Southern Africa	2007–2023	35,588,987	1,246,700	1,144,402	2,550,000,000
Ecuador	South America	1973–1992, 2007–2020	18,001,000	283,560	475,274	8,273,000,000
Indonesia	Southeast Asia	1962–2008, Jan–Nov 2016	275,501,000	1,904,569	608,299	2,250,000,000
Qatar	Middle East	1961–2019	2,695,122	11,437	1,322,000	25,244,000,000
United Arab Emirates	Middle East	1967–2026 (Note: The UAE was founded in December 1971. Its OPEC membership from 1967 originated with the Emirate of Abu Dhabi as part of the Trucial States.)	9,441,130	83,600	3,393,506	113,000,000,000

For countries that export petroleum at relatively low volume, their limited negotiating power as OPEC members does not necessarily justify the burdens imposed by OPEC production quotas and membership costs. Ecuador withdrew from OPEC in December 1992, because it was unwilling to pay the annual US$2 million membership fee and felt that it needed to produce more oil than it was allowed under its OPEC quota at the time. Ecuador then rejoined in October 2007 before leaving again in January 2020. Ecuador's Ministry of Energy and Non-Renewable Natural Resources released an official statement on 2 January 2020 which confirmed that Ecuador had left OPEC. Similar concerns prompted Gabon to suspend membership in January 1995; it rejoined in July 2016.

In May 2008, Indonesia announced that it would leave OPEC when its membership expired at the end of that year, having become a net importer of oil and being unable to meet its production quota. It rejoined the organization in January 2016, but announced another "temporary suspension" of its membership at year-end when OPEC requested a 5% production cut.

Qatar left OPEC on 1 January 2019, after joining the organization in 1961, to focus on natural gas production, of which it is the world's largest exporter in the form of liquified natural gas (LNG).

In an OPEC meeting in November 2023, Nigeria and Angola, the biggest oil producers in Sub-Saharan Africa, expressed their discontent over OPEC's quotas which, according to them, blocked their efforts to ramp up oil production and boost their foreign reserves. In December 2023, Angola announced it was leaving the OPEC because it disagreed with the organization's production quotas scheme.

On 28 April 2026, the UAE announced that it plans to leave OPEC and OPEC+ on May 1st. The Atlantic Council noted that the war with Iran has "changed everything" for the UAE, which has been targeted by Iran (an OPEC member) more than any other country, making policymakers "no longer interested in being a part of this organization." It was seen as a blow to OPEC, head of energy research at MST Financial, said it could mean "the beginning of the end of OPEC". Chief executive of Crystol Energy and secretary general of the Arab Energy Club, described the UAE's decision as having "been a long time in the making" and that they "often felt constrained by group quotas, especially amid uneven compliance by some members".

== Market information ==
One area in which OPEC members have been able to cooperate over the decades, the organisation has improved the quality and quantity of information available about the international oil market. This is helpful for a natural-resource industry whose functioning requires months and years of planning.

=== Publications and research ===
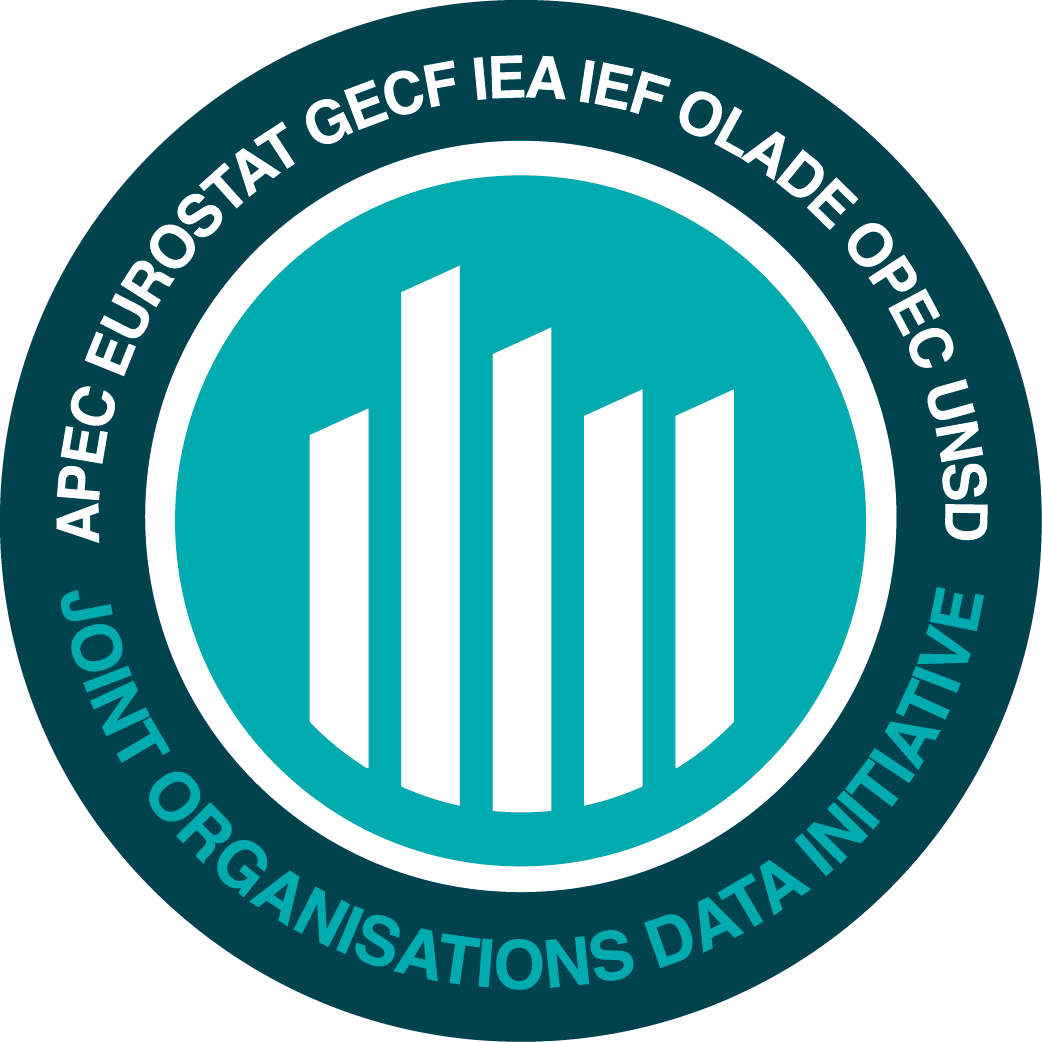
The logo of JODI, in which OPEC is a founding member

In April 2001, OPEC collaborated with five other international organizations (APEC, Eurostat, IEA, OLADE, UNSD) to improve the availability and reliability of oil data. They launched the Joint Oil Data Exercise, which in 2005 was joined by IEF and renamed the Joint Organisations Data Initiative (JODI), covering more than 90% of the global oil market. GECF joined as an eighth partner in 2014, enabling JODI also to cover nearly 90% of the global market for natural gas.

Since 2007, OPEC has published the "World Oil Outlook" (WOO) annually, in which it presents a comprehensive analysis of the global oil industry including medium- and long-term projections for supply and demand. OPEC also produces an "Annual Statistical Bulletin" (ASB), and publishes more-frequent updates in its "Monthly Oil Market Report" (MOMR) and "OPEC Bulletin".

=== Crude oil benchmarks ===
A "crude oil benchmark" is a standardized petroleum product that serves as a convenient reference price for buyers and sellers of crude oil, including standardized contracts in major futures markets since 1983. Benchmarks are used because oil prices differ (usually by a few dollars per barrel) based on variety, grade, delivery date and location, and other legal requirements.

The OPEC Reference Basket of Crudes has been an important benchmark for oil prices since 2000. It is calculated as a weighted average of prices for petroleum blends from the OPEC member countries: Saharan Blend (Algeria), Girassol (Angola), Djeno (Republic of the Congo) Rabi Light (Gabon), Iran Heavy (Islamic Republic of Iran), Basra Light (Iraq), Kuwait Export (Kuwait), Es Sider (Libya), Bonny Light (Nigeria), Arab Light (Saudi Arabia), Murban (UAE), and Merey (Venezuela).

North Sea Brent Crude Oil is the leading benchmark for Atlantic basin crude oils and is used to price approximately two-thirds of the world's traded crude oil. Other well-known benchmarks are West Texas Intermediate (WTI), Dubai Crude, Oman Crude, and Urals oil.

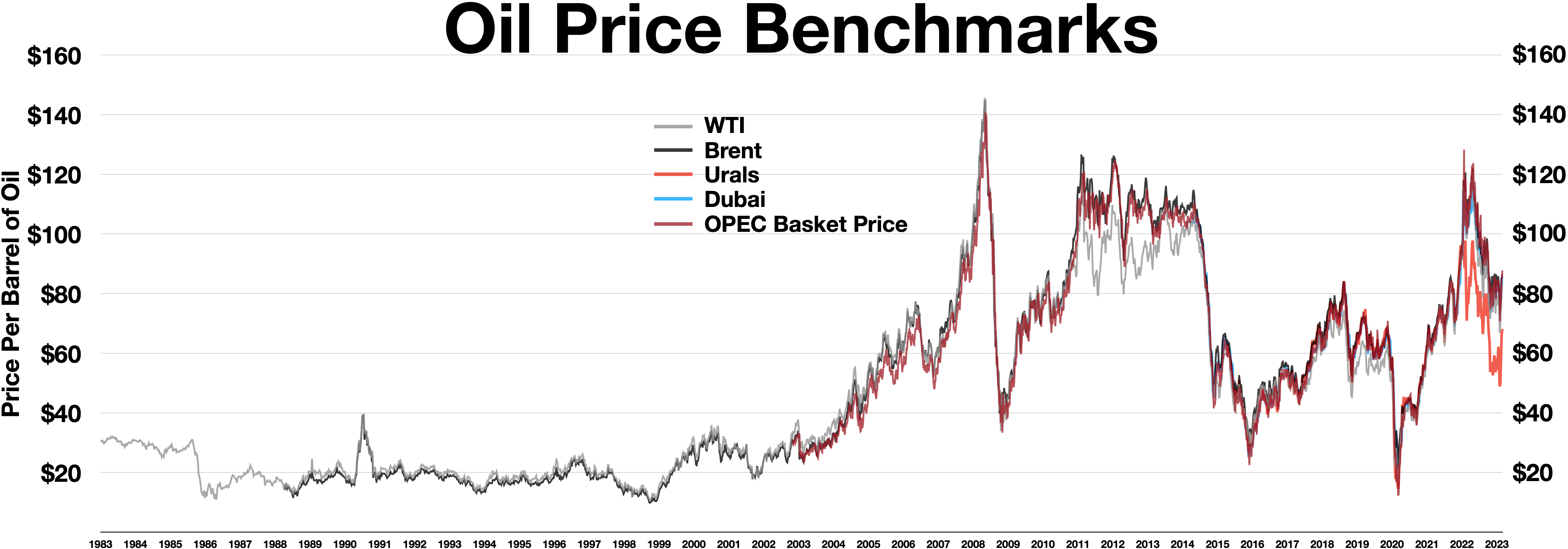
West Texas Intermediate Brent Crude Urals oil (Russian export mix) Dubai Crude OPEC Basket Price

=== Spare capacity ===
The US Energy Information Administration, the statistical arm of the US Department of Energy, defines spare capacity for crude oil market management "as the volume of production that can be brought on within 30 days and sustained for at least 90 days ... OPEC spare capacity provides an indicator of the world oil market's ability to respond to potential crises that reduce oil supplies."

In November 2014, the International Energy Agency (IEA) estimated that OPEC's "effective" spare capacity, adjusted for ongoing disruptions in countries like Libya and Nigeria, was 3.5 million barrels per day (560,000 m^{3}/d) and that this number would increase to a peak in 2017 of 4.6 million barrels per day (730,000 m^{3}/d).

By November 2015, the IEA changed its assessment "with OPEC's spare production buffer stretched thin, as Saudi Arabia – which holds the lion's share of excess capacity – and its [Persian] Gulf neighbours pump at near-record rates."

== See also ==
- Organization of Arab Petroleum Exporting Countries
- List of countries by oil exports
- Big Oil
- Energy diplomacy
- List of country groupings
- List of intergovernmental organizations
- Oligopoly
- World oil market chronology from 2003
- Gasoline
- Peak oil
- Peak gas
- Arun gas field
