= No Oil Producing and Exporting Cartels Act =

Former congressional bill

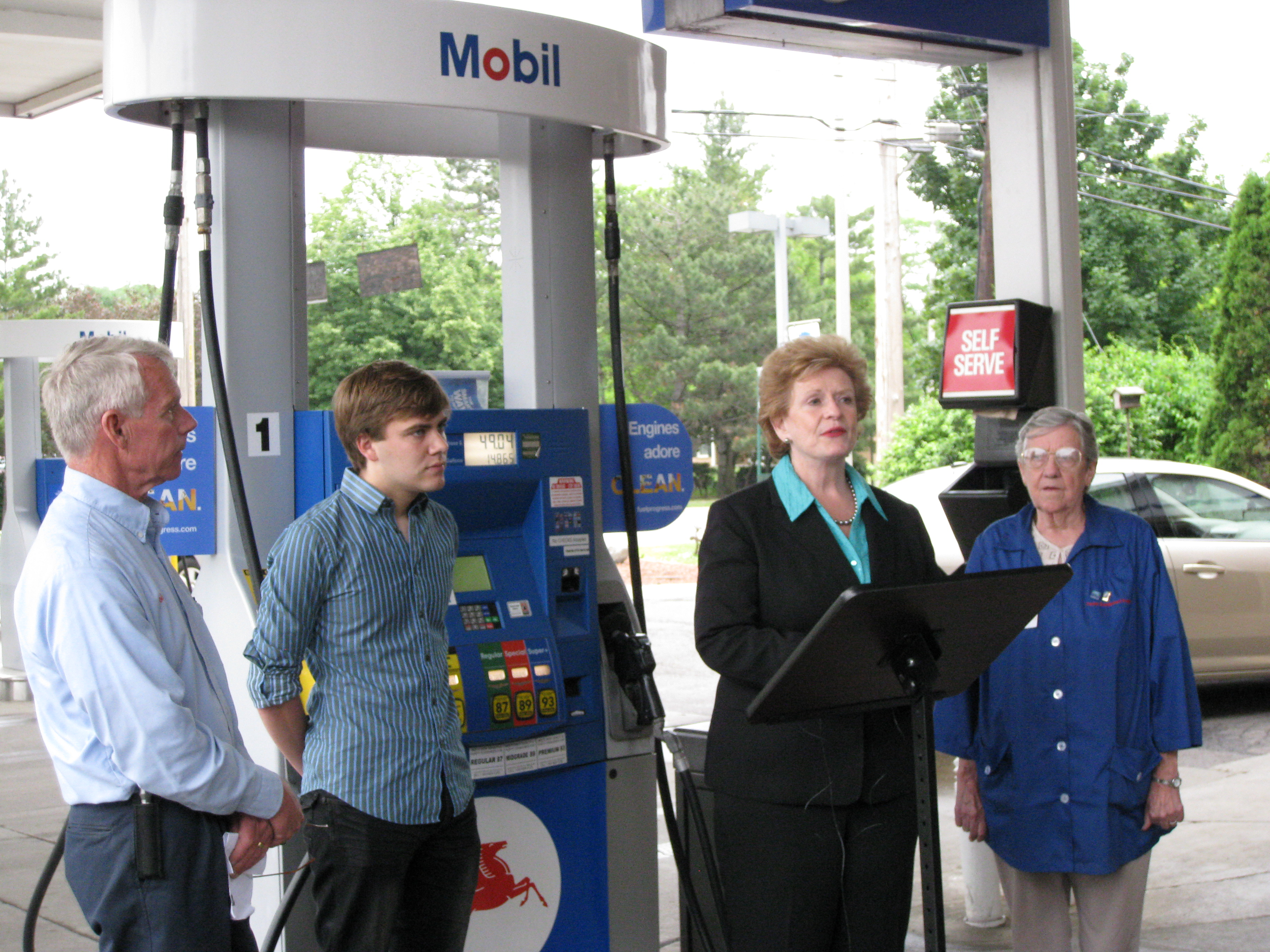
U.S. Senator Debbie Stabenow shows support for the act in 2011.

The No Oil Producing and Exporting Cartels Act (NOPEC) was a U.S. Congressional bill, never enacted, known as H.R. 2264 (in 2007) and then as part of H.R. 6074 (in 2008). NOPEC was designed to remove the state immunity shield and to allow the international oil cartel, OPEC, and its national oil companies to be sued under U.S. antitrust law for anti-competitive attempts to limit the world's supply of petroleum and the consequent impact on oil prices. Despite popular sentiment against OPEC, legislative proposals to limit the organization's sovereign immunity have so far been unsuccessful. "Varied forms of a NOPEC bill have been introduced some 16 times since 2000, only to be vehemently resisted by the oil industry and its allied oil interests like the American Petroleum Institute and their legion of 'K' Street Lobbyists."

The NOPEC Act was initially sponsored and introduced by Sen. Herb Kohl, D-WI, in June 2000 (S. 2778). The bill had 9 bipartisan cosponsors, including Sen. Chuck Schumer, D-NY, Sen. Patrick Leahy, D-VT; Sen. Chuck Grassley, R-IA; Sen. Arlen Specter, R-PA; and Sen. Joe Lieberman, D-CT. That bill passed the Senate Judiciary Committee on September 21, 2000. NOPEC was reintroduced in the Senate by Sen. Kohl in every Congress until his retirement in 2013 and passed the Senate Judiciary Committee in Congress.

The identical text of the NOPEC bill was also introduced in the House of Representatives by Representative John Conyers (D-Michigan), in May 2007 and then as H.R. 6074 by Representative Steve Kagan (D-Wisconsin). In the U.S. House of Representatives, the 2007 bill had 12 bipartisan co-sponsors in the House, which included Rep. Dennis J. Kucinich (D-Ohio). H.R. 2264 also had strong bipartisan support in the U.S. Senate. Judiciary Committee Chairman Patrick Leahy (D-Vermont) said: "It is long past time for this to become law." H.R. 2264 was passed by the House of Representatives in May 2007 as a stand-alone bill by a vote of 345–72. That same month, it also passed the Senate by a vote of 70-23 as part of its energy measure. As part of the Gas Price Relief Act, NOPEC (H.R. 6074) was then passed in the House of Representatives, in May 2008, by a vote of 324–84. President George W. Bush reiterated his previous promise to veto the bill. Under a continued veto threat, a team of senators reintroduced the bill just a week before President Bush left office. However, NOPEC/H.R. 6074 did not then come to a final Senate vote. With continued bipartisan support, Rep. Steve Chabot (R-Ohio) sponsored NOPEC in 2011, as H.R. 1346. NOPEC has not gone beyond its introduction subsequently.

NOPEC has been the Congressional effort to address the issue that, under federal law, foreign governments cannot be sued for predatory pricing or failing to comply with federal antitrust laws. Thus, the purpose of the bill was to extend similar Sherman Antitrust consumer protection, so as to include protection against collusion and predatory pricing by foreign governments and international cartels, such as the Organization of the Petroleum Exporting Countries (OPEC).

As written and passed, H.R. 2264:

Amends the Sherman Act to declare it to be illegal and a violation of the Act for any foreign state or instrumentality thereof to act collectively or in combination with any other foreign state or any other person, whether by cartel or any other association or form of cooperation or joint action, to limit the production or distribution of oil, natural gas, or any other petroleum product (petroleum), to set or maintain the price of petroleum, or to otherwise take any action in restraint of trade for petroleum, when such action has a direct, substantial, and reasonably foreseeable effect on the market, supply, price, or distribution of petroleum in the United States.

It also summarizes enforcement parameters as follows:

Denies a foreign state engaged in such conduct sovereign immunity from the jurisdiction or judgments of U.S. courts in any action brought to enforce this Act. States that no U.S. court shall decline, based on the act of state doctrine, to make a determination on the merits in an action brought under this Act. Authorizes the Attorney General to bring an action in U.S. district court to enforce this Act. Makes an exception to the jurisdictional immunity of a foreign state in an action brought under this Act.

== Controversy surrounding passage under veto threat ==
At the time of passage, U.S. motorists were paying $3.21/gallon for gasoline. The London-based Center for Global Energy Studies cited OPEC restrictions on output as the driving force in pushing oil prices in 2008 to above $60/barrel. The study proposed that this OPEC-driven price increase was the central cause of the consumer gas price increase at the pump.

The many bipartisan supporters of the bill, in Congress and elsewhere, felt disavowed by President Bush's staunch veto threats. Representative Conyers stated: "The Bush administration's threat to veto this bill is just further proof that the administration favors the international oil cartel over the American consumer." Then-senators Barack Obama and Hillary Clinton both voted "yes" on NOPEC. Commodities trader and author Raymond J. Learsy put it this way: "In defiance of oil interests Congress voted overwhelmingly for the Bill (70 votes to 23 in the Senate and 345 to 72 in the House). This was an act of refreshing and courageous leadership by our Congress only to be abandoned after President George W. Bush, that great stalwart of oil interests and friend of Saudi Arabia, made it clear that he would veto the bill should it land on his desk."

Supporters of the Bush veto included the U.S. Chamber of Commerce (USCC). In its 2007 letter to House members, the USCC stated opposition to the bill: "Although H.R. 2264 limits itself to restraint of trade in oil, natural gas, or petroleum products, it would create a dangerous precedent. There would be a domino effect: once sovereign immunity has been eliminated for one action of a state or its agents, it can be eliminated for all state actions and the actions of agents of the state." Energy analyst Kevin Book noted that increased regulatory fears, as a result of NOPEC, could prompt a flight of capital. Others, including some officials in the oil-producing countries, also expressed concerns that "a nation caught up in the throes of a populist movement" might look to seize energy-related plants and even non-energy assets in the United States that are owned by these foreign governments or their affiliated companies. Some officials in the Bush Administration agreed that OPEC countries' United States assets could be targeted, if a court were to award damages in a resulting antitrust lawsuit. They further feared that this "would likely spur retaliatory action against American interests in those countries and lead to a reduction in oil available to U.S. refiners."

In 2012, economist Dambisa Moyo wrote: "It is beyond question that if OPEC member nations were private companies, they would have been fined heavily and/or had their executives put in jail in the United States or the United Kingdom." Beyond energy alone, Moyo then cited the Bush veto of NOPEC, "for reasons of public policy" and in order to support market-based economies, as an indication to China that it too could also expect continued "lack of any forceful international law" regarding China's potential future international monopolistic policies for "influencing prices, and violating antitrust rules."

== Litigation ==
In 2011 a U.S. District Court case involving two class actions was brought by private gasoline retailers against oil production companies most of which were owned in whole or in part by OPEC member nations (Citgo and the Venezuelan State Oil Company (PDVSA)), alleging antitrust violations. As has been the case since first introduced, public discord on the issues was widely disparate. With an apparent policy reversal of his position as senator, the Obama administration favored dismissal in an amicus brief supporting the "sovereign immunity" defense for international commodity producers.

The United States Court of Appeals, Fifth Circuit held that if a case presents a political question, they lacked subject matter jurisdiction, agreeing with the district court that adjudication of the case is barred by application of the political question doctrine. Given that the OPEC member nations included Algeria, Angola, Ecuador, Iran, Iraq, Kuwait, Libya, Nigeria, Qatar, Saudi Arabia, the United Arab Emirates, and Venezuela, the Fifth Circuit's opinion sited much case precedence and stated: "Such matters are so exclusively entrusted to the political branches of government as to be largely immune from judicial inquiry or interference."

Textually, the 111th Congress NOPEC Act of 2009 would also expressly exclude a private right of action, and "leaves the decision to prosecute OPEC members in the hands of the executive branch by giving the Justice Department sole authority to prosecute." (statement of Sen. Arlen Specter). This view reinforces the court's conclusion that there is an unusual need for unquestioning adherence to the political decision made by the branches of government that are accountable to the electorate: "Relations with OPEC nations regarding U.S. oil supplies are not to be conducted through private litigation." In their amicus brief the Obama Administration agreed that the appropriate means for achieving United States objectives, involving international energy markets, lies in diplomatic efforts, encompassing the executive branch and the justice department, with the countries involved rather than private lawsuits by each individual company, against sovereign nations in U.S. courts. Convinced that these matters deeply implicate concerns of foreign and defense policy, concerns that constitutionally belong in the executive and legislative departments, the Fifth Circuit concluded that they lacked jurisdiction to adjudicate the claims presented.

== Ongoing debate and future possibilities ==
As with all cartels, compliance from cartel members is a central factor in any price-fixing effectiveness.

At the start of 2015 and continuing to this day, efforts have resumed toward achieving additional recourse against multinational price-fixing and future possibilities for more rigorous, international antitrust protection for US consumers. In 2016, Saudi Arabia and Russia, the world's two largest producers, formed a "working group" pact "to monitor" the oil market at regular intervals. In 2018, a NOPEC bill, sponsored by Steve Chabot, R-OH and six additional bipartisan cosponsors, was reintroduced by the 115th Congress, but again failed to be enacted into law.

=== Biden administration ===
Facing rising oil and gas prices in 2021 and 2022, the Biden administration has sought support in Congress, attempting once again to hold foreign entities, such as OPEC, accountable. This has assumed a multi-prong approach, through a combined enactment of NOPEC's Sherman Antitrust protection, along with more strenuous enforcement of already existing legislation within the Foreign Corrupt Practices Act (FCPA). On November 15, 2021, enactment of the Energy Policy And Conservation Act (EPCA) grants limited, discretionary executive regulatory powers to address international antitrust conduct that may occur subsequent to that act’s several enactment dates, with varied oil-price-limiting effects.

On March 8, 2022, President Joe Biden signed an executive order banning the import of Russian oil and gas, in response to the Russian invasion of Ukraine, with almost unanimous bipartisan Congressional support. The ongoing Russian invasion of Ukraine, with its accompanying devastation, human toll, and sustained manipulation of both world oil prices and multi-national inflation, are well documented. If bipartisan congressional support for Ukraine continues, passage could allow a greater application of currently existing international antitrust regulatory powers for addressing future US/Saudi relations, further strained under the influence of the ongoing Russo-Saudi oil-production pact. NOPEC-2022 was reintroduced in the 117th Congress, S.977 by Sen. Chuck Grassley, R-IA and cosponsored by Sen. Patrick Leahy, D-VT, Sen. Mike Lee, R-UT, and Sen. Amy Klobuchar, D-MN. An identical bill was again sponsored in the House of Representatives by Rep. Steve Chabot, R-OH and cosponsored by Rep. Jerold Nadler, D-NY and Rep. David Cicilline, D-RI. OPEC+, which includes additional oil-producing countries, such as Saudi Arabia, Russia, Iraq, UAE, and Kazakhstan concluded its 31st OPEC and non-OPEC Ministerial Meeting on 3 August 2022 via videoconference. The group’s oil production cutbacks have specifically targeted US oil and gasoline price increases, and also influence public perceptions.
