= Jody =

Jody may refer to:

- Jody (given name), a list of people with the given name
- Jody (singer), French singer, real name Julie Erikssen
- "Jody" (song), 1986 single by Jermaine Stewart
- "Jody", a 1982 song by America from View from the Ground
- "Jody", a 1971 song by The Jeff Beck Group from Rough and Ready
- "Jody", a 1984 song by Tatsuro Yamashita from Big Wave
- 4083 Jody, asteroid
- Jody or Jodie calls, in military cadence

== See also ==
- Jodie (disambiguation)
