= Fernyhough =

Fernyhough is a surname. Notable people with the surname include:

- Bernard Fernyhough (1932–2000), British Anglican priest
- Christine Fernyhough, New Zealand writer
- Ernest Fernyhough (1908–1993), British politician
- Rowland Fernyhough (born 1954), British equestrian

== See also ==
- Ferneyhough
