= Jodie =

- Gender: Unisex

Other names
- Related names: Cody, Jodi, Jody, Codey, Jodey, Joseph, Jude, Judith, Joan, Jo, Judy

Jodie is a unisex given name. It is related to names Cody, Jodi, Jody, Codey, and Jodey. It is also a rare surname. It can be used as a nickname for Joseph, Jude, Judith, Joan and Jonathan, and a variant for Jo.

== People ==
=== Female ===
==== Given name ====
- Jodie Alderson-Smith (born 1994), British ice hockey player
- Jodie Allen, senior editor at the Pew Research Center
- Jodie Aysha (born 1988), English singer and songwriter
- Jodie Bowering (born 1982), Australian softball player
- Jodie Campbell (born 1972), Australian politician
- Jodie Comer (born 1993), English actress
- Jodie Connor (born 1981), English musician
- Jodie Cooper (born 1964), retired surfer
- Jodie Davis (born 1966), Australian cricketer
- Jodie deSolla (born 1982), Canadian curler
- Jodie Dibble (born 1994), English cricketer
- Jodie Dorday (born 1968), New Zealand actress
- Jodie Dry (born 1974), Australian actress
- Jodie Evans (born 1954), American political activist
- Jodie Fields (born 1984), Australian cricket player
- Jodie Fisher (born 1960), American actress
- Jodie Foster (born 1962), American actress and director
- Jodie Grinham (born 1993), British Paralympic archer
- Jodie Henry (born 1983), Australian swimmer
- Jodie Kidd (born 1978), English fashion model and media personality
- Jodie Anne Laubenberg (born 1957), American politician
- Jodie Marsh (born 1978), English model, media personality, and bodybuilder
- Jodie McMullen (born 1974), former Miss Australia Universe
- Jodie Resther (born 1977), Canadian actress
- Jodie Rogers (born 1970), Australian diver
- Jodie Swallow (born 1981), English triathlete
- Jodie Sweetin (born 1982), American actress and television personality, who is best known for playing a character in Full House
- Jodie Waite (born 2004), Irish wheelchair basketball player
- Jodie Whittaker (born 1982), English actress
- Jodie Yemm (born 1967), Australian actress

==== Other ====
- Jodie (conjoined twin), pseudonym of Gracie Attard (born 2000), subject of a legal case
- Jodie Foster, American actress and filmmaker Alicia Foster (born 1962)
- Jodie Sands, American singer Eleanor DiSipio (1919–1996)

=== Male ===
==== Given name ====
- Jodie Broughton (born 1988), English rugby player
- Jodie Christian (1932–2012), American pianist
- Jodie Ferneyhough, President of the Canadian Music Publishers Association
- Jodie Meeks (born 1987), American basketball player

==== Nickname ====
- Jodie Beeler (1921–2002), American baseball player
- Jodie Mudd (born 1960), American golfer
- Jodie Whire (1910–1983), American football player

== Fictional characters ==
- Jodie, a character in the 1980s Canadian children's television program Today's Special
- Jodie, military slang for someone military wives have affairs with while their husbands are deployed
- Jodie (Case Closed), in the Japanese manga and anime Case Closed
- Jodie Calvano, in the soap opera River City
- Jodie Dallas, a supporting character in the 1970s television sitcom Soap, played by Billy Crystal
- Jodie Landon, in the MTV animated series Daria
- Jodie Morton, in the British soap opera Coronation Street
- Jodie Nash, in the soap opera Hollyoaks
- Jodie Phillips, from the animated series Fireman Sam
- Jodie Holmes, in the video game Beyond: Two Souls
- Jodie, in the book My Sister Jodie by Jacqueline Wilson

== Media ==
- Jodie, an unreleased television movie related to the Daria animated sitcom, currently seeking distribution.
- "Jodie", a song by Saves the Day from the album Can't Slow Down (1998)
- "Jodie", a song by SZA from the 2022 deluxe edition of the album Ctrl (2017)

== See also ==
- Jodee Nimerichter, American arts administrator
