= Joint Organisations Data Initiative =

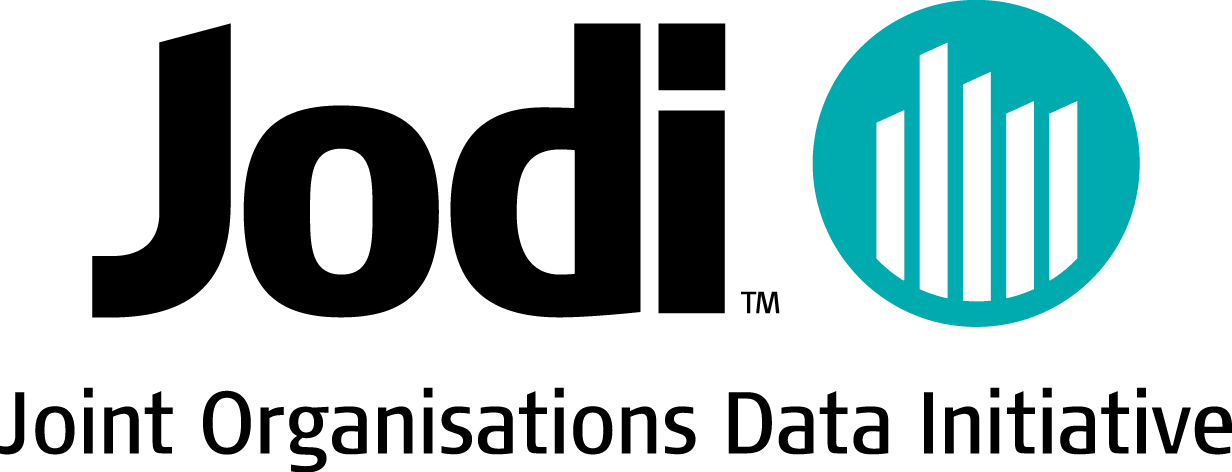
- Company type: Privately held
- Industry: Energy industry
- Founded: April 2001; United States
- Headquarters: United States
- Website: www.jodidata.org

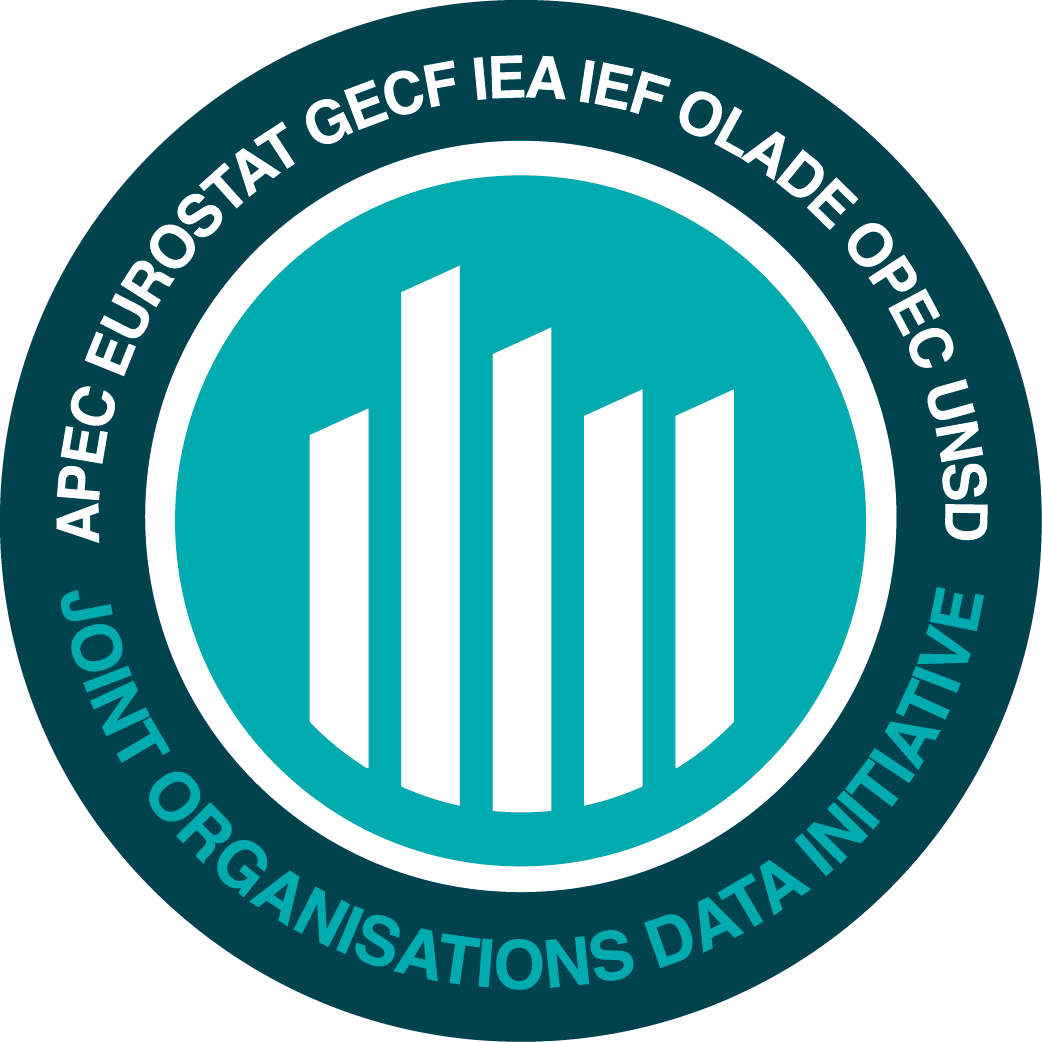
Alternate logo

The Joint Organisations Data Initiative (JODI) is an international collaboration to improve the availability and reliability of data on petroleum and natural gas. First named the "Joint Oil Data Exercise", the collaboration was launched in April 2001 with six international organisations: Asia-Pacific Economic Cooperation (APEC), Statistical Office of the European Communities (Eurostat), International Energy Agency (IEA), Latin American Energy Organization (OLADE), Organization of the Petroleum Exporting Countries (OPEC), and United Nations Statistics Division (UNSD). In 2005, the effort was renamed JODI, joined by the International Energy Forum (IEF), and covered more than 90% of the global oil market. The Gas Exporting Countries Forum (GECF) joined as an eighth partner in 2014, enabling JODI also to cover nearly 90% of the global market for natural gas.
