= Jody Weiner =

American film producer

Jody Weiner (b. Jody Carl Weiner) is an American novelist, non-fiction author, attorney and producer.

Weiner was born and raised in Chicago, where he spent eleven years defending criminal cases in state and federal courts. He holds a B.A. in sociology from the University of Wisconsin, Madison and a J.D. from DePaul University. In an interview with the Table Read, Weiner said his interest in writing began when he was backpacking around Europe and Morocco for a year after college. During this period, he began writing a novel that he never completed because he returned to Chicago and entered law school. In 1985, he moved to San Francisco. There he began to write books and practice civil law. Weiner's clients have included MRI machine inventor Raymond Damadian, an Ohio death row inmate, NBA All-Star Norm Van Lier, and SKYY vodka inventor Maurice Kanbar. He has also advised the Artist's Guild of San Francisco and the Gorilla Foundation, and he is a former director of the Golda Foundation. Weiner is President of the Board of Directors of the Litquake Foundation, producer of the annual San Francisco Litquake Festival. Weiner was a 2013 recipient of The Acker Award for achievement in the Avant Garde. Weiner is a member of the California and the Illinois State Bar, Federal District Courts for the Northern Districts of California and Illinois, and the Court of Appeals for the Sixth, Seventh and Ninth Federal Circuits. Weiner is married to contemporary American figurative painter Nancy Calef.

Weiner wrote the literary suspense novel Prisoners of Truth (2004) that draws in part from his experiences defending criminal cases in Chicago. Along with Jane Goodall, Dave Soldier and other animal activists, he co-authored Kinship With Animals (2006), an anthology of true interspecies encounters. In the book, he writes about serving as attorney to Koko the Gorilla. Weiner also co-edited Resistance: A Radical Political and Social History of the Lower East Side by Clayton Patterson (2007), and co-managed publication of Vali Myers-a Memoir by Gianni Menichetti (2007). Weiner was consulting producer and counsel for the documentary A Conversation with Koko (1999), which received a Genesis Award for Best PBS Documentary in 2000. Weiner was also a consulting producer and wrote additional dialogue for Hoodwinked Too! Hood vs. Evil . Weiner also co-authored Peoplescapes, My Story From Purging To Painting an illustrated Memoir by Nancy Calef with Jody Weiner (2014 Babu Books). He was also writer/director of the animated music video Lost My Mind Again (2004), and producer of Perfect Two, a music video by Ceej (Hoodwinked Too! Hood vs. Evil soundtrack, 2011). Weiner also wrote the original comedy screenplay, Heck No! (adapted for streaming series in 2023).

Weiner's newest book is Raise Your Other Right Hand (2025, Speaking Volumes), a legal thriller described by author Byron Spooner as “Nick and Nora Charles meet The Lincoln Lawyer in this slam dunk novel.” According to Donald H. Harrison, publisher and editor of San Diego Jewish World, "Author Weiner is himself an attorney and a sports fan, who describes the games of law and basketball with equal authority.” Set in San Francisco, Raise Your Other Right Hand blends legal fiction and satirical crime fiction. In Bay City News Foundation's Local News Matters, journalist Anita Katz writes Raise Your Other Right Hand “delivers welcome and terrific uplift in these distressing times.” According to a review in the Midwest Book Review, the book is a “darkly humorous and suspenseful tale that deftly unfolds.”

== Works published ==
- Prisoners of Truth (2004, softcover 2006, Council Oak Books) (ISBN 1-57178-124-2)
- Kinship With Animals (2006, Council Oak Books) (ISBN 1571781897) (co-author, introduction by William Shatner)
- Resistance: A Radical Political and Social History of the Lower East Side by Clayton Patterson. (2007, Seven Stories Press) (ISBN 1583227458) (co-editor)
- “Hot Koko,” California Lawyer, July 2005. p. 80.
- Peoplescapes, My Story From Purging To Painting an illustrated Memoir by Nancy Calef with Jody Weiner (2014 Babu Books). ISBN 978-0989817103
- Raise Your other Right Hand (2025, Speaking Volumes, LLC) (ISBN 979-8-89022-250-3)
