= Jodie Allen =

American journalist (1938–2026)

Jodie Tetreault Allen
- Born: Josephine Edith Tetreault; September 1, 1938; New York City, U.S.
- Died: September 15, 2026 (aged 88); Washington, D.C., U.S.
- Education: Vassar College (BS)
- Occupations: Journalist, author and editor

Jodie Tetreault Allen (September 1, 1938 – September 15, 2026) was an American journalist and author. She was the Department Assistant Secretary at the United States Department of Labor and Senior Editor at Pew Research Center.

Allen was most known for her journalistic contributions toward U.S. economic reforms and policy management. With her research interests in public policy making, social security reforms, political economy, and geopolitics, she contributed to many news outlets, including Washington Post and Slate Magazine, and authored a book chapter in the book Muslims in Western Politics.

She was the Senior Editor at Pew Research Center from 2005 to 2011. She died on September 15, 2026.

== Early life ==
Allen was born on September 1, 1938 in New York City, and grew up on the Upper East Side. Her father was a lawyer, and her mother, although also a law school graduate, worked as a secretary.

== Education and career ==
Allen earned a Bachelor's degree in Political Science and Economics from Vassar College. While there, she was elected to Phi Beta Kappa. She spent the next two decades working for public and private think tanks such as the Urban Institute, developing early computer models and focusing on the political and demographic trends of tax programs. Allen began her government career in 1977 under the Carter Administration when she joined the U.S. Department of Labor as Deputy Assistant Secretary for Policy and Research, and served in that role until 1980. After writing occasional op-eds during that time for the Washington Post, Allen's work impressed editorial page editor Meg Greenfield, who hired Allen in 1980 as an editorial writer. She would eventually serve as the editor of the Outlook section for the Post.

She would leave the Post in 1996 to serve as the Washington Editor at Slate Magazine, and working in that role for three years. Subsequently, she held an appointment at the U.S. News & World Report in 1999, where she worked in various capacities, including as the managing editor of the magazine, until the end of her tenure in 2005. Following this, she worked as the Senior Editor at the Pew Research Center from 2005 until her retirement in 2011.

== Work ==
Allen authored numerous publications, including articles in news outlets, think tanks and book chapters. In her obituary, the Post described her writing as focusing on "trade and budget deficits, monetary policy, environmental spending, and social reforms, among other weighty topics," describing her prose as "digestible, even delicious."

=== US economic policies and reforms ===
While examining the idea of Negative Income Tax (NIT), she established that NIT and the already placed welfare system could not go hand in hand since the latter provides in-kind benefits along with cash, which practically vitiates NIT's attraction. She also identified administrative flaws in the NIT, mainly focusing on the income-accounting period, and indicated the possibility of benefits denial to families in need along with potential tax evasion. Exploring the public sentiment on U.S. domestic economic policies, she highlighted a divide among U.S. citizens along the economic lines.

Focusing her research on the Inflation dynamics in the US, Allen dismissed the notion of economics influencing partisan affiliation. Her analysis of Nixon's welfare reforms substantiated the reduction of welfare benefits as a counterproductive move since it restricted benefits to certain poor factions, including orphans and the unemployed. Additionally, she proposed a Principal Earner Rule in her evaluation of President Carter's welfare reforms. She identified loopholes that could lead to systematic manipulation, preventing the needy from receiving their entitled assistance.

=== Global political developments ===
Allen studied the Suffrage Movement extensively. She analyzed the female voter turnout post-suffrage movement and probed the potential reasons behind anti-suffragist views, ultimately determining the controlling factor as one of the primary reasons for low female voter turnaround.

While evaluating the relationship between Europe and its Muslim population, Allen uncovered a hidden rift between natives and Muslims, primarily due to the stereotypes associated with Muslims in general. Her analysis revealed that Muslims currently residing in Europe are less likely to be interested in a clash of civilizations than those in the middle east. Following the 2005 youth riots in France, she conducted an analysis of the societal integration status of Muslims in French society. The survey investigated the self-identification trend among French Muslims, reported that the split was almost even, with 42% identifying as French citizens first and 46% identifying as Muslims first, and concluded that despite the unrest, the French model for societal integration still surpassed its European counterparts.

== Personal life and death ==
In 1960, she married Princeton alumnus lawyer George V. Allen Jr., a conservationist who served as the deputy assistant administrator in the EPA at its founding. They had two sons together. Her husband predeceased her in 2014. Allen herself died from complications of lung cancer on September 15, 2026, at the age of 88.

== Selected articles ==
- Allen, J. T. (1973). Designing income maintenance systems: The income accounting problem (Vol. 134, No. 958-959). Urban Institute.
- Packer, A. H., Gordon, N. M., Allen, J. T., & Gordon, N. M. (1978). Women's and Welfare Reform. Challenge, 20(6), 45-50.
- Allen, J. T. (2002). Negative income tax. The concise encyclopedia of economics.
- Allen, J. T. (2006). The French-Muslim connection: Is France doing a better job of integration than its critics. Pew Research Center, 17.
- Allen, J. T. (2011). Re-counting poverty.
