= Jody Upshaw =

Canadian musician

- Born: 2003 (age 22–23)
- Origin: Lower Sackville, Nova Scotia, Canada
- Genres: R&B
- Years active: 2017–present

Jody Upshaw (born 2003) is a Canadian R&B artist.

== Career ==
At age 14 in 2018, Upshaw released her debut EP. Upshaw released the single "Glitter and Gold" with teen rapper Shay Pitts that same year. Upshaw's single "Straight Shooter" was produced by Classified and released in 2018. In 2022, the song was featured in the season two premiere of Euphoria.

Upshaw was featured in the 2020 documentary short, "Youth Hiphop and Halifax", written and directed by Harmony Adesola for the Being Black in Halifax series. Upshaw was named Music Nova Scotia's artist in residence in 2022.

Upshaw appeared as a special guest for TLC at the May 2024 Moncton, New Brunswick stop on their tour.

== Personal life ==
Upshaw is originally from Lower Sackville, Nova Scotia. She began singing and performing when she was eleven. Her father, Marvin, was a rapper who performed under the name KL.

== Awards and nominations ==
Year	Award	Category	Work	Result	Ref.
2017	East Coast Music Awards	African Nova Scotian Artist of the Year	n/a	Nominated	
2018	African Nova Scotian Music Awards	ANSMA Rising Star Award	n/a	Won	
2019	East Coast Music Awards	Bucky Adams Memorial Award (formerly African Nova Scotian Artist of the Year)	n/a	Nominated	
2019	East Coast Music Awards	R&B/Soul Recording of the Year	Straight Shooter	Nominated	
2020	East Coast Music Awards	Bucky Adams Memorial Award	n/a	Nominated	
2020	East Coast Music Awards	R&B/soul recording of the year	Guilty One	Nominated	
2022	Music Nova Scotia Awards	African Nova Scotian Artist of the Year	n/a	Nominated	
2024	Nova Scotia Music & Industry Awards	African Nova Scotian Artist of the Year	n/a	Nominated	
