= Jody Kraus =

American lawyer

Jody S. Ponsa-Kraus is a Patricia D. and R. Paul Yetter Professor of Law at Columbia Law School.

== Biography ==
Kraus holds a J.D. from Yale Law School, a Ph.D. in Philosophy, an M.A. from the University of Arizona, and a B.A. from the Ohio State University. He received numerous awards at the University of Arizona and served as a Senior Editor of the Yale Law Journal. He entered Yale Law as a member of the Yale Law Journal after having been published in the Journal before enrolling.

Prior to joining the faculties of Columbia Law and Columbia University, Ponsa-Kraus was the David E. Kaufman & Leopold C. Glass Professor of Law at the University of Pennsylvania Law School, where he also co-directed the Institute for Law and Philosophy. Before joining Penn Law, he was on the faculty of the University of Virginia School of Law as the Robert E. Scott Distinguished Professor of Law and Philosophy and as the Albert Clark Tate, Jr. Research Professor. In 2012, he joined the faculty of Columbia Law School, and is also a professor in Columbia University's Department of Philosophy. He will serve, in addition, as co-director of the Law School's Center for Law & Philosophy.

He frequently uses economic theory in his lectures. He is co-author of the textbook Contract Law and Theory.

== Publications ==
=== Books ===
- Contract Law and Theory (with Robert E. Scott) (LexisNexis, 4th ed. 2007).
- The Jurisprudential Foundations of Corporate and Commercial Law (ed. with Steven D. Walt) (Cambridge University Press, 2000).
- The Limits of Hobbesian Contractarianism (Cambridge University Press, 1993).
