= International Energy Forum =

International energy organization

International Energy Forum (IEF)
- Logo
- Secretariat: Riyadh, Saudi Arabia
- Membership: 73 member states

Leaders
  - Secretary General: Mr Joseph McMonigle (USA)
- Establishment: 1991
- Website www.ief.org

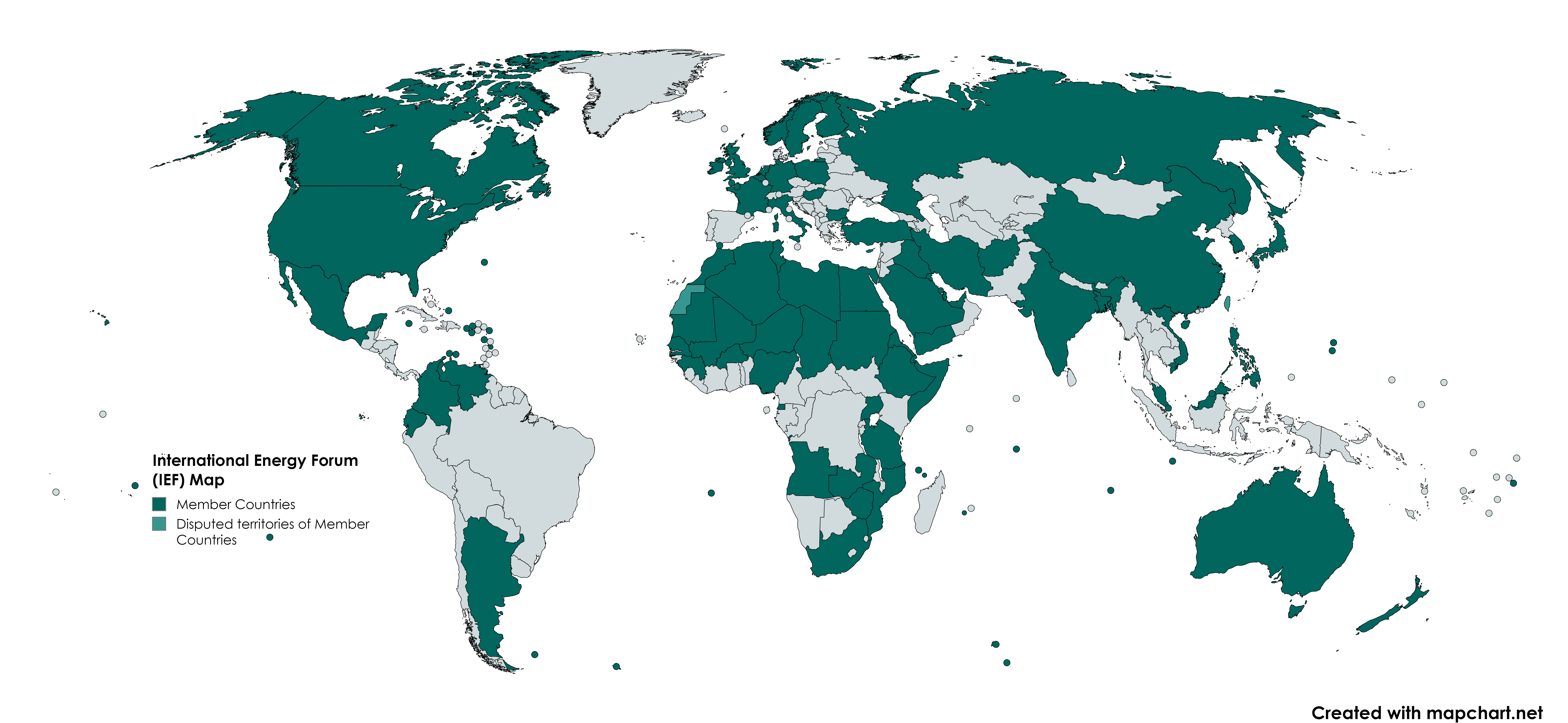
International Energy Forum IEF Map

The International Energy Forum (IEF) is an inter-governmental, non-profit international organisation which aims to foster greater mutual understanding and awareness of common energy interests among its members. The 73 Member Countries of the Forum are signatories to the IEF Charter, which outlines the framework of the global energy dialogue through this inter-governmental arrangement.

Participants not only include IEA and OPEC countries, but also key international actors such as Brazil, China, India, Mexico, Russia, and South Africa. The IEF member countries account for more than 90 percent of global oil and gas supply and demand.

The Forum's biennial Ministerial Meetings are the world's largest gathering of Energy Ministers.

Through the Forum and its associated events, IEF Ministers, their officials, energy industry executives, and other experts engage in a dialogue on global energy security.

The IEF is promoted by a permanent Secretariat based in the Diplomatic Quarter of Riyadh, Saudi Arabia.

The International Energy Forum also coordinates the Joint Organisations Data Initiative (JODI) which is a concrete outcome of the global energy dialogue.

== Objectives ==
The fundamental aims of the Forum are:

- Fostering greater mutual understanding and awareness of common energy interests among its Members;
- Promoting a better understanding of the benefits of stable and transparent energy markets for the health of the world economy, the security of energy supply and demand, and the expansion of global trade and investment in energy resources and technology;
- Identifying and promoting principles and guidelines that enhance energy market transparency, stability and sustainability;
- Narrowing the differences among energy producing, consuming and transit Member States on global energy issues and promoting a fuller understanding of their interdependency and the benefits to be gained from cooperation through dialogue among them, as well as between them and energy related industries;
- Promoting the study and exchange of views on the inter-relationships among energy, technology, environmental issues, economic growth and development;
- Building confidence and trust through improved information sharing among States; and
- Facilitating the collection, compilation and dissemination of data, information and analyses that contribute to greater market transparency, stability and sustainability.

== History ==
The concept of a systematic producer-consumer dialogue emerged in the 1970s as a part of the general reorganisation in the global political and economic order with energy markets transforming the structure within individual countries as well as power balances and relations between countries. In the wake of the first Gulf War in the early 1990s, consumers and producers recognised their joint interest in the stability of the oil market, creating greater awareness, and understanding sensitivities toward each other's interests.

The Gulf War revealed the importance of a concerted and coordinated global response to an adverse supply shock. On October 1, 1990, at the United Nations General Assembly, Venezuelan President Carlos Andrés Pérez called for an urgent meeting of producers and consumers under the auspices of the United Nations to help the world face the growing uncertainties and politics of the oil market. With the support of French President François Mitterrand and Norwegian Prime Minister Gro Brundtland political support was gained for the initiation of a Ministerial Seminar of producers and consumers.

Established in Paris in July 1991, the International Energy Forum was created in order to stabilise the global energy market after the 1970s energy crisis, and the 1980s oil glut. One of the main priorities of the Forum was to bring together member-states and private corporations in order to increase awareness of national and international interests, and the workings of the market in order to avoid the instabilities of the previous two decades.

In January 2026, United States President Donald Trump announced that the United States would withdraw from the organization.

== Organizations ==
Headquartered in the Diplomatic Quarter of Riyadh, Saudi Arabia, The International Energy Forum is a Secretariat organization. The forum is governed by an executive board which is composed of 31 representatives of ministries of the respective member states. The body is led by Secretary General, Joe McMonigle of USA. Mr McMonigle was appointed on August 1, 2020.

The International Energy Forum Secretariat is to ensure that the Forum is promoting a neutral platform for the exchange of information and views regarding conflicts and the future of the energy industry. Another goal of the executive board is to include both public and private entities in the global energy market in order to bring forth multiple viewpoints to the Forum.

Additional duties that are performed by the Executive Board include organizing all of the Forum's activities. These include all meetings and summits that are put on by the Forum, and also coordinates the Forum's Programme of Work.

== The Joint Organisations Data Initiative (JODI) ==
IEF Energy Ministers recognized that the exchange and free dissemination of energy market data helps to mitigate uncertainty by improving market transparency and facilitating well-informed decision-making that instills investor confidence, supports market stability and strengthens energy security. The Joint Organisations Data Initiative, coordinated by the IEF since 2005, relies on the combined efforts of the eight JODI partner organisations (APEC, EUROSTAT, GECF, IEA, OLADE, OPEC, and UNSD), and more than 100 national administrations, and industry stakeholders to gather, verify and transmit the official data that populates JODI's two public databases JODI-Oil and JODI-Gas with key monthly supply and demand indicators.
