= Jodie Ferneyhough =

Canadian music producer and industry executive

Jodie Ferneyhough is the president and founder of CCS Rights Management and Daytripper Music Publishing. He was Creative Director for Universal Music Publishing Canada for almost a decade until leaving the company in 2011.

Ferneyhough joined UMPG-Canada in June 2001 as creative director and worked his way up to managing director. He was instrumental in the careers of Canadian artists k-os, Sam Roberts and Hedley. He also worked with established international acts Jann Arden, Shania Twain, and Avril Lavigne. Before joining Universal he was music publisher peermusic's creative director, and before that he worked in management, booking and as a festival and trade show coordinator.

In 2011, Ferneyhough started CCS Rights Management- a rights management company that specializes in "administration, management and creative services for a variety of musical and audiovisual intellectual properties, including music publishing, neighbouring rights, and retransmission." CCS Rights Management music publishing repertoire includes such properties as Spin Master, Glenn Gould, Blue Ant Media, Aircraft Pictures and Kassner Music Publishing Associated Publishers. They also administer ancillary rights for the TV productions of Spin Master as well as the Schitt’s Creek series.

In 2021, CCS launched Daytripper Music Publishing (Daytripper), a new division and stand-alone brand dedicated to creative development of established and up-and-coming artists and songwriters.

== Beginnings ==
Ferneyhough worked as an artist manager, promoter, tour agent, product buyer and warehouse clerk, before he began his career in music publishing in 1989 at peermusic.

== Awards ==
Ferneyhough was named Canadian Music Publisher of the Year at the 2003 and 2005 CCMAs, as well as Publisher of the Year at the annual CMW Industry Awards in 2005.

== Lecturer and guest speaker engagements ==
Ferneyhough has lectured at the Harris Institute for the Arts, the Trebas Institute, the Canadian Design Academy and at the Osgoode Law School. He has been a guest speaker and panelist at the Canadian Music Week and NxNE Festivals in Toronto, the East Coast Music Awards, the Music West Festival in Vancouver, the CMJ in New York City and Concrete Foundations in Los Angeles.
