= Swing producer =

Supplier of a commodity with oligopolistic qualities

A swing producer or swing supplier is a supplier or a close oligopolistic group of suppliers of any commodity, controlling its global deposits and possessing large spare production capacity. A swing producer is able to increase or decrease commodity supply at minimal additional internal cost, and thus able to influence prices and balance the markets, providing downside protection in the short to middle term. Examples of swing producers include Saudi Arabia in oil, Russia in potash fertilizers, and, historically, the De Beers Company in diamonds.

== Modes ==
By modeling the swing producer behavior, John Morecroft describes two modes: normal swing mode and punitive mode. Usually in the normal mode, the swing producer responds to market price fluctuations by marginally increasing or decreasing its output in order to maintain stable prices for all producers. However, independent participants can take unjust advantage of the reduced supply and increase their output in order to win a larger market share. In such cases, the swing producer switches to the punitive mode and greatly increases its product output in order to reduce prices, causing losses for other producers and making them cooperate. Swing consumers to nullify the exorbitant pricing power of the swing producers, regulate their consumption or utilize their reserve production capacity or depend on the stocks available to reduce imports till the prices reduce to comfortable level.

== See also ==
- Elasticity (economics)
- Peak oil
- Price of petroleum
