= Cody (given name) =

- Gender: Unisex (usually male)
- Language: English and Irish

Origin
- Languages: 1. Irish Gaelic; 2. English
- Origin: Cody (surname)
- Meaning: "Descendant of Cuidightheach", or a "person of western origin"

Other names
- Variant forms: Codi; Codie; Kodi; Kodie; Kody
- Related names: Codey, Coady

Cody is a name in the English language, ultimately of Irish and English origin. Spellings include Codi, Codie, Coedee, Kodi, Kodie, and Kody. Other variants are Coady and Codey.

According to A Dictionary of First Names, Cody is "a transferred use of the Irish surname, an Anglicized form of Gaelic O'Cuidighthigh meaning 'descendant of Cuidightheach' (originally a byname for a helpful person), or of Mac Óda 'son of Óda' (a personal name of uncertain origin)".

In the United States, the name Cody is often associated with the west, specifically California.

Notable people and characters with these names include:

== People ==
=== Single name ===
- Kody (born 1978), Belgian television host

=== A ===
- Kody Afusia (born 1992), American football player
- Cody Allen (born 1988), American baseball player
- Cody Almond (born 1989), Canadian-Swiss ice hockey player
- Cody Anderson (disambiguation), multiple people
- Cody Andrews (born 1987), New Zealand cricketer
- Cody Arens (born 1993), American actor
- Cody Arnoux (born 1988), American soccer player
- Cody Asche (born 1990), American baseball player

=== B ===
- Cody Baker (born 2004), American soccer player
- Cody Balogh (born 1986), American football player
- Cody Barton (born 1996), American football player
- Cody Bass (born 1987), Canadian ice hockey player
- Kodie Bedford, Australian screenwriter
- Cody Belanger, American politician
- Cody Bellinger (born 1995), American baseball player
- Cody Blackbird, American musician
- Kody Bliss (born 1985), American football player
- Kody Blois (born 1991), Canadian politician
- Codie Briggs (born 1990), Australian rules footballer
- Cody Brookwell (born 1986), Canadian ice hockey player
- Cody Brown (born 1986), American football player
- Cody Brundage (born 1994), American mixed martial artist

=== C ===
- Cody Calafiore (born 1990), American television personality
- Cody Cameron (born 1970), American voice actor
- Cody Campbell (disambiguation), multiple people
- Cody Canada (born 1976), American musician
- Cody Carlson (born 1963), American football player
- Cody Carnes (born 1989), American musician
- Cody Carpenter (born 1984), American musician
- Cody Carroll (born 1992), American baseball player
- Kody Case (born 1998), American football player
- Cody Cassidy (born 1981), Canadian wrestler
- Cody Ceci (born 1993), Canadian ice hockey player
- Cody Chesnutt (born 1968), American musician
- Cody Chetty (born 1991), South African cricketer
- Cody Christian (born 1995), American actor
- Cody Cillo (born 1980), American baseball player
- Cody Clark (disambiguation), multiple people
- Coty Clarke (born 1992), American basketball
- Cody Claver (born 1996), Dutch footballer
- Kody Clemens (born 1996), American baseball player
- Cody Cole (born 1990), New Zealand weightlifter
- Cody Collier (born 1985), American radio personality
- Cody Cooke (born 1993), English footballer
- Cody Core (born 1994), American football player
- Cody Coughlin (born 1995), American stock car racing driver
- Cody Crocker (born 1971), Australian stock car racing driver
- Cody Cropper (born 1993), American football player
- Cody Crowley (born 1993), Canadian boxer
- Kodie Curran (born 1989), Canadian ice hockey player

=== D ===
- Cody Daigle-Orians (born 1975/1976), American writer
- Cody Davis (born 1999), American entrepreneur
- Cody Deal (born 1986), American actor
- Cody Deaner (born 1982), Canadian professional wrestler
- Cody Decker (born 1987), American baseball player
- Cody Demps (born 1993), American basketball player
- Cody Donovan (born 1981), American Jiu-Jitsu practitioner
- Cody Drameh (born 2001), English footballer
- Cody Durden (born 1991), American mixed martial artist

=== E ===
- Cody Eakin (born 1991), Canadian ice hockey player
- Cody Ege (born 1991), American baseball player
- Cody Ellis (born 1990), Australian basketball player
- Cody Eppley (born 1985), American baseball player
- Cody Erickson (born 1988), American stock car racing driver
- Cody Estes (born 1994), American actor

=== F ===
- Cody Fajardo (born 1992), American football player
- Cody Fern (born 1988), Australian actor and director
- Cody Ford (born 1997), American football player
- Cody Forsythe (born 1990), American baseball player
- Cody Fowler (1892–1978), American lawyer
- Cody Franson (born 1987), Canadian ice hockey player
- Cody Fry, American singer-songwriter

=== G ===
- Cody Gakpo (born 1999), Dutch footballer
- Codi Galloway, American politician
- Cody Garbrandt (born 1991), American mixed martial artist
- Cody Gibson (born 1987), American mixed martial artist
- Cody Glass (born 1999), Canadian ice hockey player
- Cody Glenn (born 1986), American football player
- Cody Goloubef (born 1989), Canadian ice hockey player
- Cody Grace (born 1996), Australian-Canadian football player
- Cody Gribble (born 1990), American golfer
- Cody Grimm (born 1987), American football player
- Cody Groat, Canadian historian

=== H ===
- Cody Hall (born 1991), American professional wrestler
- Cody Hall (baseball) (born 1988), American baseball player
- Cody Hanson (born 1982), American musician
- Cody Harris (disambiguation), multiple people
- Cody Hawkins (born 1988), American football player
- Cody Hay (born 1983), Canadian figure skater
- Cody Henson, American politician
- Codi Heuer (born 1996), American baseball player
- Cody Hodges (born 1982), American philanthropist, motivational speaker, and former professional American football player
- Cody Hodgson (born 1990), Canadian ice hockey player
- Kody House (born 1990), Australian footballer
- Kody Hoese (born 1997), American baseball player
- Cody Hoffman (born 1991), American football player
- Cody Hollister (born 1993), American football player
- Cody Horlacher (born 1987), American politician
- Cody Horn (born 1988), American actress and model

=== J ===
- Cody Jamieson (born 1987), Canadian lacrosse player
- Kodi Jacques (born 2000), Australian rules footballer
- Cody Jinks (born 1980), American singer-songwriter
- Cody Johnson (born 1987), American singer-songwriter
- Cody Johnson (footballer), English footballer
- Cody Jones (born 1951), American football player

=== K ===
- Cody Kasch (born 1987), American actor
- Cody Kearsley, Canadian actor
- Cody Keenan (born 1980/1981), American politician
- Kody Keplinger (born 1991), American author
- Cody Kessler (born 1993), American football player
- Cody Kilby, American musician
- Cody Kolodziejzyk (born 1990), Canadian comedian
- Cody Kukuk (born 1993), American baseball player
- Cody Kunyk (born 1990), Canadian ice hockey player

=== L ===
- Cody Lambert (born 1961), American cowboy
- Cody Lampl (born 1986), American-German ice hockey player
- Cody Lane (born 1996), American stock car racing driver
- Cody Lange (born 1994), Australian netball player
- Cody Larsen (born 1987), American football player
- Cody Lassen, American theatre producer
- Cody Latimer (born 1992), American football player
- Cody Laurendi (born 1988), Puerto Rican baseball player
- Cody Law (born 1995), American mixed martial artist
- Cody Laweryson (born 1998), American baseball player
- Cody Ledbetter (1973–2015), American football player
- Cody Legebokoff (born 1990), Canadian serial killer
- Cody Lightning (born 1986), Canadian actor
- Cody Lindenberg (born 2002), American football player
- Cody Linley (born 1989), American actor
- Cody Longo (1988–2023), American actor
- Kody Lostroh (born 1985), American professional rodeo cowboy
- Cody Lundin (born 1967), American survival trainer

=== M ===
- Cody Mandell (born 1992), American football player
- Cody Martin (disambiguation), multiple people
- Cody Mattern (born 1981), American fencer
- Cody Mauch (born 1999), American football player
- Cody Maynard (born 1986), American politician
- Cody McCormick (born 1983), Canadian ice hockey player
- Cody McDonald (born 1986), English footballer
- Cody McKay (born 1974), Canadian baseball player
- Cody McKenzie (born 1987), American mixed martial artist
- Cody McLeod (born 1984), Canadian ice hockey player
- Cody McMahan (born 1991), American stock car racing driver
- Cody McMains (born 1985), American actor
- Cody Meakin (born 1989), Australian wheelchair basketball player
- Cody Melphy (born 1993), American rugby union footballer
- Cody Michaels, American professional wrestler
- Cody Miles (born 1991), American rapper
- Cody Miller (born 1992), American swimmer
- Codi Miller-McIntyre (born 1994), American basketball player
- Cody Mitchell (born 1986), American politician
- Cody Mizell (born 1991), American soccer player
- Cody Morissette (born 2000), American baseball player
- Cody Morris (born 1996), American professional baseball pitcher

=== N ===
- Cody Nelson (born 1988), Australian rugby league footballer
- Cody Nickson (born 1985), American radio personality

=== O ===
- Cody O'Connell (born 1994), American football player
- Codie Elaine Oliver, American producer

=== P ===
- Cody Parkey (born 1992), American football player
- Cody Pearcy (born 1989), American football player
- Cody Pfister (born 1990), American mixed martial artist
- Cody Pickett (born 1980), American football player
- Cody Ponce (born 1994), American baseball player
- Cody Porter (born 1997), Canadian ice hockey player
- Cody Poteet (born 1994), American baseball player
- Codie Prevost (born 1984), Canadian musician
- Cody Prewitt (born 1992), American football player
- Cody Prior (born 1999), Irish footballer

=== R ===
- Cody Ramsey (born 2000), Australian rugby league footballer
- Cody Ransom (born 1976), American baseball player
- Cody Reed (born 1993), American baseball player
- Cody Reeder, American internet personality
- Cody Reichard (born 1987), American ice hockey player
- Cody Rhodes (born 1985), American professional wrestler
- Cody Renard Richard (born 1988), American stage manager
- Cody Riggs (born 1991), American football player
- Cody Rigsby (born 1987), American fitness instructor
- Cody Riley (born 1997), American basketball player
- Cody Risien (born 1957), American football player
- Cody Rogers, American politician
- Cody Ross (born 1980), American baseball player
- Cody Rudkowsky (born 1978), Canadian ice hockey player

=== S ===
- Cody Satterwhite (born 1987), American baseball player
- Cody Scarpetta (born 1988), American baseball player
- Cody Sedlock (born 1995), American baseball player
- Coty Sensabaugh (born 1988), American football player
- Kodie Shane (born 1998), American rapper
- Cody Simon (born 2002), American football player
- Cody Simpson (born 1997), Australian singer
- Cody Slate (born 1987), American football player
- Cody Smith, American politician
- Kodi Smit-McPhee (born 1996), Australian actor
- Cody Sorensen (born 1986), Canadian bobsledder
- Cody Speller (born 1994), Canadian football player
- Cody Spencer (born 1981), American football player
- Cody Stamann (born 1989), American mixed martial artist
- Cody Stanley (born 1988), American baseball player
- Cody Stashak (born 1994), American professional baseball pitcher
- Kody Stattmann (born 2000), Australian basketball player
- Cody Sun (born 1997), Canadian professional gamer
- Kody Swanson (born 1988), American racing driver

=== T ===
- Cody Thomas (born 1994), American football player
- Cody Thompson (disambiguation), multiple people
- Cody Toppert (born 1983), American basketball player
- Cody Trahan (born 1988), American softball player

=== V ===
- Kody Vanderwal (born 2001), American stock car racing driver
- Cody Vasut (born 1987), American politician
- Cody Votolato (born 1982), American musician

=== W ===
- Kody Wakasa (born 1994), American soccer player
- Cody Walker (disambiguation), multiple people
- Cody Wallace (born 1984), American football player
- Cody Ware (born 1995), American auto racing driver
- Cody Webb (born 1988), American motorcycle racer
- Cody Webster (born 1991), American football player
- Cody Weightman (born 2001), Australian rules footballer
- Cody Westman (born 1978), Canadian filmmaker
- Cody White (disambiguation), multiple people
- Cody Whitehair (born 1992), American football player
- Cody Wichmann (born 1992), American football player
- Cody Wild (born 1987), American ice hockey player
- Cody Willard (born 1972), American journalist
- Cody Williams (born 2004), American basketball player
- Cody Wilson (born 1988), American activist
- Cody Wilson (baseball) (born 1996), American baseball player
- Cody Wise (born 1995), American singer
- Cody Wong (born 2002), Hong Kong tennis player
- Cody Wood (born 1984), American actor
- Cody Wylie, American politician

=== Y ===
- Cody Yerkovich, New Zealand model
- Codi Yusuf (born 1998), South African cricketer

=== Z ===
- Cody Zeller (born 1992), American basketball player

== Fictional characters ==
- Commander Cody (Star Wars, in Star Wars: The Clone Wars
- Cody Madison, in the television series Baywatch
- Cody Martin, in the television series The Suite Life of Zack and Cody and The Suite Life on Deck
- Cody Swanson, in the anime series Glitter Force (originally named Kouta Midorikawa)
- Cody Willis, on the Australian soap opera Neighbours

== See also ==
- Coady, a disambiguation page for "Coady"
- Codey, a disambiguation page for "Codey"
- Codi (disambiguation), a disambiguation page for "Codi"
- Cody (surname), a page for people with the surname "Cody"
- Coty (disambiguation), a disambiguation page for "Coty"
- Kodi (disambiguation), a disambiguation page for "Kodi"
- Koty (disambiguation), a disambiguation page for "Koty"
- Cudahy, another variant of Ó Cuidighthigh
