= Cody (surname) =

Cody is a surname primarily of Irish origin, "an Anglicized form of Gaelic O'Cuidighthigh meaning 'descendant of Cuidightheach' (originally a byname for a helpful person), or of Mac Óda 'son of Óda' (a personal name of uncertain origin)". A Kilkenny family, formerly known as Archdeacon, assumed this name.

People with the surname include:

== A ==
- Ann Codee (1890–1961), Belgian actress, sometimes referred to as Anna Cody
- Ann Cody (born 1963), American Paralympic athlete

== B ==
- Bec Cody (born 1973), American politician
- Betty Cody (1921–2014), Canadian singer
- Bill Cody (disambiguation), multiple people
- Brian Cody (born 1954), Irish hurling coach
- Buffalo Bill Cody (1846–1917), American cowboy

== C ==
- Connie Cody, Canadian politician
- Corey Cody, USAF Flight Engineer

== D ==
- Dan Cody (born 1981), American football player
- Diablo Cody (born 1978), American screenwriter
- Diarmuid Cody (born 1994), Irish hurler
- Don Cody (born 1936), Canadian businessman
- Donnacha Cody (born 1985), Irish hurler

== E ==
- Ed Cody (1923–1994), American football player
- Eileen Cody (born 1954), American politician
- Eoin Cody (born 2000), Irish hurler
- Evan Cody (born 1995), Irish hurler

== F ==
- Frank Cody (1948–2023), American record producer

== G ==
- Gab Cody, American filmmaker
- Gina Cody, Iranian-Canadian engineer
- Gwendalyn F. Cody (1922–2021), American politician

== H ==
- Harry Cody (speed skater), Canadian speed skater
- Harry Cody (musician) (born 1962), Swedish musician
- Henry John Cody (1868–1951), Canadian academic administrator
- Hiram Alfred Cody (1872–1948), Canadian author

== I ==
- Iron Eyes Cody (1907–1999), American actor

== J ==
- Jack Cody (1885–1963), American swimming coach
- Jake Cody (born 1988), English poker player
- James A. Cody (born 1965), American Air Force officer
- Jennifer Cody (born 1969), American dancer
- Jim Cody (1943–2022), Australian rugby league footballer
- Joe Cody (1952–1989), American horse breeder
- John Cody (disambiguation), multiple people
- Josh Cody (1892–1961), American athletic coach

== K ==
- Kathleen Cody (disambiguation), multiple people
- Kristin Cody, American acoustical engineer
- Kyle Cody (born 1994), American baseball player

== L ==
- Leslie Cody (1889–1969), Australian rugby league footballer
- Lew Cody (1884–1934), American actor
- Liza Cody (born 1944), British author

== M ==
- Mac Cody (born 1972), American football player
- Martin L. Cody (born 1941), American ecologist
- Matt Cody (1895–1974), Australian rules footballer
- Melissa Cody (born 1983), American native weaver
- Michael Cody (born 1997), Irish hurler
- Morrill Cody (1901–1987), American diplomat

== P ==
- Patricia Cody (1940–2004), American tennis player

== R ==
- Radmilla Cody (born 1975), American native model
- Richard A. Cody (born 1950), American general
- Robert Tree Cody (1951–2023), American native musician
- Robin Cody (born 1943), American writer

== S ==
- Samuel Franklin Cody (1867–1913), American showman and aviator
- Sara Cody, American doctor
- Shaun Cody (born 1983), American football player
- Sherwin Cody (1868–1959), American writer

== T ==
- Tay Cody (born 1977), American football coach
- Terrence Cody (born 1988), American football player

== W ==
- Wayne Cody (1936–2002), American sportscaster
- William Francis Cody (1916–1978), American architect

== See also ==
- Cody (given name), a page for people with the given name "Cody"
- Colonel Cody (disambiguation), a disambiguation page for Colonels surnamed "Cody"
- Commander Cody (disambiguation), a disambiguation page for "Commander Cody"
- Codey, given name and surname
