= Cudahy =

Cudahy is an Irish surname, related to the name "Cuddihy" and is native to Counties Cork and Tipperary. The Irish form of this name would be written as Ó Cuidighthigh (male) or Ní Chuidighthigh (female). It may refer to:

== Surname ==
- Anthony Cudahy (born 1989), American painter
- Edward Cudahy Jr. (1885–1966), American kidnapping victim; M. Cudahy's nephew
- John Cudahy (1887–1943), American real estate developer and diplomat
- Michael Cudahy (electronics) (born 1924–2022), American entrepreneur
- Michael Cudahy (industrialist) (1841–1910), American founder of Cudahy Packing Company
- Patrick Cudahy (1849–1919), American industrialist
- Richard Dickson Cudahy (1926–2015), American jurist

== Places ==
- Cudahy, California
- Cudahy, Wisconsin

== Other ==
- Cudahy Packing Company

== See also ==
- Cody (given name), in some cases another variant of Ó Cuidighthigh
