= Codi =

Codi may refer to:

== People ==
=== Persons with the surname ===
- Bartolomeo Coda (16th century; also called Bartolomeo Cod1), Italian painter, son of Benedetto, brother of Francesco and Raffaele
- Benedetto Coda (1460-1535; also called Benedetto Codi), Italian painter, father of Barolomeo and Francesco and Raffaele
- Francesco Coda (16th century; also called Francesco Codi), Italian painter, brother of Bartolomeo and Raffaele, son of Benedetto Coda
- Raffaele Coda (16th century; also called Raffaele Codi), Italian painter, brother of Bartolomeo and Francesco, son of Benedetto Coda

=== Persons with the given name ===
- Codi (given name)
- Codi Galloway (fl. 21st century), American politician
- Codi Heuer (born 1996), American baseball player
- Codi Miller-McIntyre (born 1994), American basketball player
- Codi Yusuf (born 1998), South African cricketer

== Other uses ==
- Codi (river), France; a river
- CoDi ("Collect and Distribute"), cellular automaton model for neural networks
- Codi / \ Cysgu, 2014 album by Yws Gwynedd
- DOI-CODI (Portuguese: Departamento de Operações de Informações - Centro de Operações de Defesa Interna, lit. 'Department of Information Operations - Center for Internal Defense Operations'), Brazil's intelligence and political repression agency from 1964 to 1985
- Cosima "Codi" Noline, a fictional character from the 1990 Barbara Kingsolver novel Animal Dreams

== See also ==
- Cody (disambiguation)
- Coady, a given name and surname
- Codey, a given name and surname
- Kodi (disambiguation)
- CODL (disambiguation)
- CoD1
