= Michael Cudahy =

Michael Cudahy may refer to:

- Michael Cudahy (electronics) (1924–2022), entrepreneur, business executive and philanthropist
- Michael Cudahy (industrialist) (1841–1910), American meat packing company owner
- Michael Cudahy, a.k.a. The Millionaire, member of musical group Combustible Edison
