= Harry Cody =

Harry Cody may refer to:

- Harry Cody (speed skater)
- Harry Cody (musician)
