= Rich Coady =

Rich Coady may refer to:

- Rich Coady (center) (born 1944), American football center
- Rich Coady (defensive back) (born 1976), American football defensive back, son of the former
