= Coady =

Coady is both a surname and a given name. Notable people with the name include:

Surname:

- Aaron Coady, American drag queen also known as Sharon Needles
- C.A.J. (Tony) Coady (21st century), Australian philosopher
- Charles Pearce Coady (1868–1934), member of the United States House of Representatives
- Conor Coady (born 1993), English footballer
- Davida Coady (1938–2018), American pediatrician and international health activist
- Ed Coady (born circa 1867), American football player
- Frances Coady, veteran British publisher
- Ger Coady (born 1996), Irish hurler
- Joe Coady (1934–2008), Irish hurler
- John Coady (born 1960), Irish footballer
- Lewis Coady (born 1976), English former professional footballer
- Lynn Coady (born 1970), Canadian novelist and journalist
- Mick Coady (born 1958), English footballer (Sunderland AFC, Carlisle United, Wolverhampton Wanderers)
- Moses Coady (1882–1959), Roman Catholic priest, educator and leader of the co-operative movement
- Olivia Coady (born 1990), New Zealand rugby union player
- Rich Coady (disambiguation), multiple people
- Richard Coady (born 1988), Irish hurler
- Siobhán Coady (21st century), Newfoundland and Labrador politician
- Tess Coady (born 2000), Australian snowboarder

Given name:

- Albert Coady Wedemeyer (1897–1989), American soldier
- Coady Willis, drummer

== See also ==
- Coady, Texas, unincorporated area
- Cody (disambiguation)
