= Cody Lake =

Cody Lake, or Lake Cody, may refer to:

- Cody Lake (Minnesota), a lake in Minnesota, USA
- Lake Cody (Quebec), a lake in Quebec, Canada
