= Cody =

Cody may refer to:

== People and fictional characters ==
- Cody (given name), including a list of people and fictional characters
- Cody (surname), including a list of people
- Cody Rhodes (born 1985), American professional wrestler also known by the ring name Cody

== Places ==
=== Canada ===
- Cody, British Columbia, a ghost town

=== United States ===
- Cody, Florida, an unincorporated community
- Cody (Duluth), Minnesota, a neighborhood
- Cody, Missouri, an unincorporated community
- Cody, Nebraska, a village
- Cody, Wyoming, a city and county seat
- Cody Lake (Minnesota)

== Arts and entertainment ==
=== Music ===
- Cody (band), a Danish musical group
- George Frayne IV, alias Commander Cody, singer and pianist of Commander Cody and His Lost Planet Airmen, an American country rock band
- Cody (album), an album by Joyce Manor, 2016
- Come On Die Young (CODY), an album, or the title track, by Scottish band Mogwai, 1999
- "Cody", a song by Cupcakke from Dauntless Manifesto, 2024
- "Cody", a song by the Killers from Pressure Machine, 2021

=== Other arts and entertainment ===
- Cody (TV series), a series of Australian television movies
- Commando Cody, the hero in two 1950s movie serials
- Cody, the surname of Janine "Smurf", Andrew "Pope", Craig, Deran, Joshua "J", and Lena Cody's criminal family in the Animal Kingdom television series
- Commander Cody (Star Wars), a Star Wars clone trooper

== Other uses ==
- CodY protein family, a bacterial protein family
- Cody Streaming, a streaming media service
- USNS Cody, a 21st century US Navy expeditionary fast transport
- Cyclone Cody, a South Pacific cyclone
- Sourcegraph Cody, an artificial intelligence coding assistant see Sourcegraph #Sourcegraph Cody

== See also ==
- Cote (disambiguation)
- Nakia Codie (born 1977), American football player
- Kodi (disambiguation)
