= Michael Cudahy (industrialist) =

American meat packer (1841–1910)

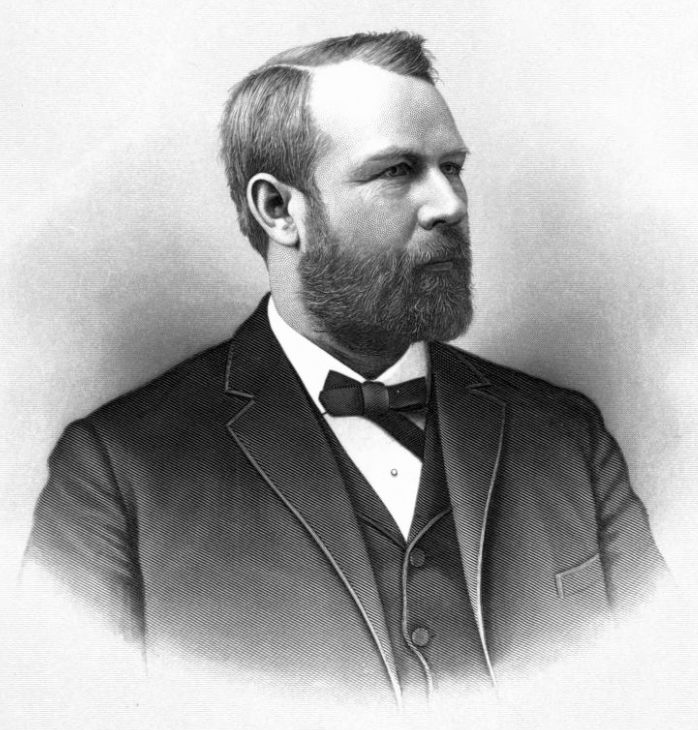
- Born: December 7, 1841; Callan, County Kilkenny, Ireland
- Died: November 27, 1910 (aged 68); Chicago, Illinois, U.S.
- Resting place: Calvary Cemetery, Evanston, Illinois
- Occupation: Industrialist
- Spouse: Catharine Sullivan (m. 1866–1910)
- Children: 7
- Relatives: Patrick Cudahy (brother); Edward Cudahy, Jr. (nephew); John Cudahy (nephew); Michael Cudahy (great-nephew)

Michael Cudahy (/ˈkʌdəheɪ/ CUD-ə-hey); December 7, 1841 – November 27, 1910) was an American industrialist who, along with two brothers, established the Cudahy Packing Company in 1890.

== Early life ==
Cudahy was born in Callan, County Kilkenny in 1841 to Patrick and Elizabeth (née Shaw) Cudahy. The family emigrated to the United States in 1849, and eventually settled in Milwaukee, Wisconsin.

== Career ==
Cudahy dropped out of school at age 14 and found a job working at Layton and Plankinton, Milwaukee, an area meat packing plant. He worked his way up the ranks and eventually became a private meat inspector. By 1869, Cudahy was a manager in charge of the packing house at Plankinton, Armour and Company, which had been established in Milwaukee in 1852. In 1873, he was made partner in Armour and Company.

With the help of his brothers Edward and Patrick, he established the Cudahy Packing Company in South Omaha, Nebraska in 1890.

=== Real estate ===
By the late 19th century, Cudahy had become a wealthy man living a comfortable life. He took an interest in Mackinac Island, Michigan as a summer home. He also owned a home in Hubbard's Annex on the island in the late 19th century, which he later sold to his brother Edward. He then went to California in 1897 and traded in real estate to expand his fortune. He returned to Mackinac Island in 1904 and bought 150 acres (0.61 km^{2}), making him one of the largest landowners on Mackinac Island. In 1908, Cudahy sold his share of the Cudahy Meatpacking Company and acquired a 2,800 acre (11 km²) Rancho San Antonio east of Los Angeles, California. He subdivided the ranch and sold it as one acre (4,000 m²) lots. This area was incorporated in 1960 as the City of Cudahy.

==== Stonecliffe ====
Cudahy handpicked renowned architect Frederick Wainwright Perkins to fulfill his visions of a West Bluff mansion. Perkins also designed the Governors Mansion on the island. In 1904, construction was completed on his mansion which he named Stonecliffe which was the largest private home on Mackinac Island. It went through a number of owners after Cudahy's death in 1910. In 1970, Stonecliffe was purchased by an entrepreneur named George Staffan who converted the mansion and associated buildings into a first class resort hotel called The Inn at Stonecliffe in which capacity it continues to function to this day.

== Personal life ==
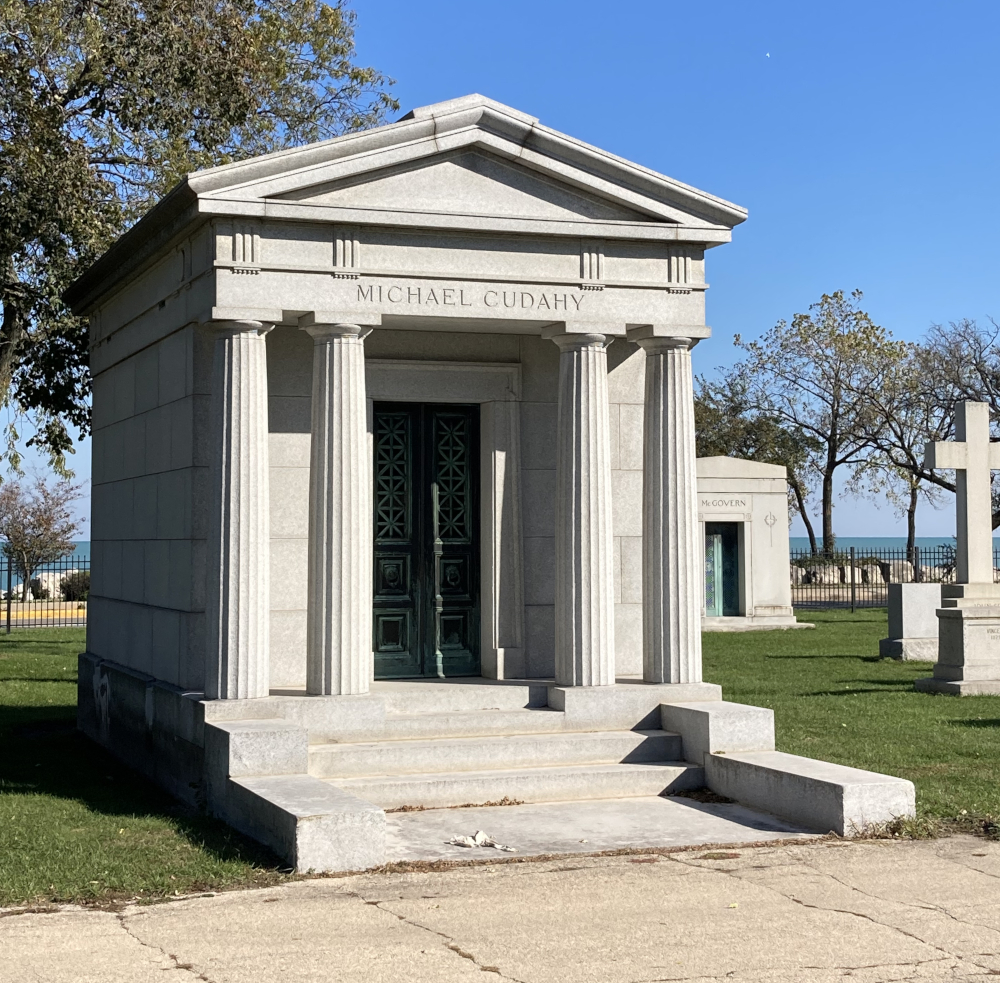
Cudahy mausoleum at Calvary Cemetery

In 1866, Cudahy married Catharine Sullivan. The couple had seven children, four boys and three girls.

== Death ==
On November 27, 1910, Cudahy died of double pneumonia at a Chicago hospital. He is buried in Calvary Cemetery in Evanston, Illinois.

== See also ==
- History of Omaha
