= Ted J. Case =

American ecologist (1947–2015)

Ted Joseph Case (19 July 1947 – 31 December 2015) was an American biologist and ecologist affiliated with the University of California, San Diego. He joined the faculty of UC San Diego in 1978, and was later elected to the American Academy of Arts and Sciences in 2004. Case was known for his contributions to ecology, including multiple books on community and theoretical ecology.

Born on 19 July 1947 in Sioux City, Iowa, Case attended the University of Redlands and graduated with a bachelor's degree in 1969. He received a Ph.D. from the University of California, Irvine in 1974 and pursued postdoctoral research at the University of California, Davis. In 1975, Case joined Purdue University as a faculty member, but in 1978 he moved to the University of California, San Diego.

The University of California Press published Ted J. Case and Martin L. Cody's book Island Biogeography in the Sea of Cortéz in 1983. Case went on to coedit with Jared Diamond the book Community Ecology, which was published by Harper & Row in 1986 as a broad overview of the field including chapters contributed by 35 authors. In 1999, Oxford University Press published Case's An Illustrated Guide to Theoretical Ecology, which includes analysis of the mathematical formulas underpinning theoretical ecology, supplemented with graphs and other visualizations. In 2004, Case was elected to the American Academy of Arts and Sciences. He "died of a sudden heart attack while trail running on December 31, 2015", aged 68 years old.
