= Edward Cudahy Jr. =

American kidnapping victim

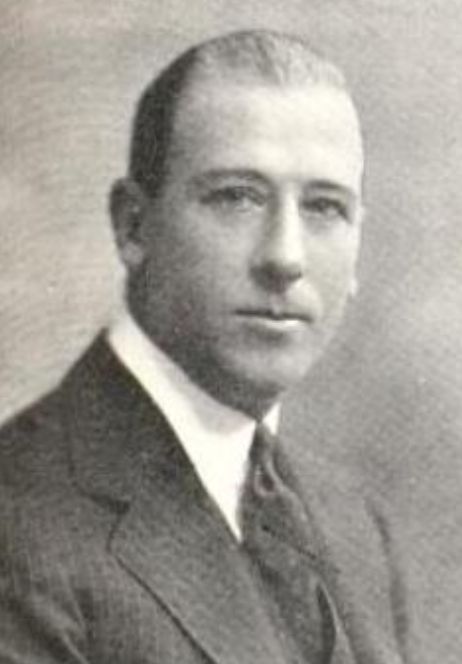
- Edward A. Cudahy Jr., from a 1923 publication
- Born: Edward Aloysius Cudahy Jr. August 22, 1885; Omaha, Nebraska, U.S.
- Died: January 8, 1966 (aged 80); Phoenix, Arizona, U.S.
- Employer: Cudahy Packing Company
- Spouse(s): Margaret Carry (1919–1942; divorced); Eleanor Peabody Cochran (1944)
- Children: 3
- Relatives: Patrick Cudahy (uncle); John Cudahy (cousin); Michael Cudahy (first cousin, once removed)

Edward Aloysius Cudahy Jr. (/ˈkʌdəheɪ/ CUD-ə-hey); August 22, 1885 – January 8, 1966), also known as Eddie Cudahy, was kidnapped on December 18, 1900 in Omaha, Nebraska. Edward Cudahy Sr. was the wealthy owner of the Cudahy Packing Company, which helped build the Omaha Stockyards through the 1950s. Cudahy Sr. paid the ransom for the return of his son and made the kidnapper, Pat Crowe, a popular author, lecturer and actor for a brief period. The Cudahy case is said to have influenced many succeeding kidnappings, including those of the Lindbergh baby, Bobby Greenlease, and Marion Parker.

== Kidnapping ==
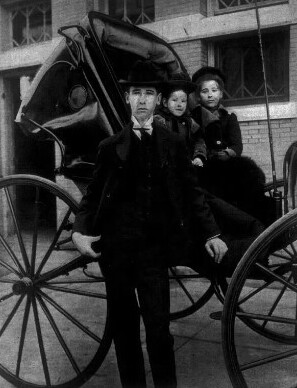
Photograph of Cudahy, c. December 1900.

On the evening of December 18, 1900, 15-year-old Edward Cudahy Jr. left his house to run an errand in his Old Gold Coast neighborhood. As he walked home, a carriage pulled beside him and a man jumped out and grabbed him, pulling him inside. His father, the millionaire owner of the Cudahy Packing Company at the Omaha Stockyards, returned from a dinner engagement at 10:30 p.m. to discover his son missing. The next morning, the Omaha Bee, the Daily News, and the World-Herald all carried the story across their front pages.

The next morning, Cudahy closed his plant and encouraged his 2,000 workers to look for his son. His competitors did the same, and soon 7,000 people were searching Omaha. At 9:00 am, he received a phone call advising him to search his front yard, where his coachman found a ransom note:

Mr. Cudahy: We have kidnapped your child and demand $25,000 for his safe return. If you give us the money he will return as safe as when you last saw him, but if you refuse, we will put acid in his eyes and blind him... Get the money all in gold, 5, 10 and 20 (dollar) pieces... Get in your buggy alone on the night of December 19 at 7 o'clock p.m. Follow the paved road toward Fremont. When you come to a lantern...by the side of the road, place the money by the lantern and immediately turn your horse around and return home.

The kidnapper foresaw the possibility of Cudahy not paying the ransom, and also referred in his note to the kidnapping of Charley Ross, aged 4, in Philadelphia on July 1, 1874. After being advised by police not to pay the ransom (and being at the time heavily in debt), his father, Christian Ross, never saw his child again. The Cudahy kidnapper noted that Christian Ross regretted for the rest of his life that he took the advice of the police. Their note continued,

Ross died of a broken heart, sorry that he allowed the detectives to dictate to him. Cudahy, you are up against it, and there is only one way out - give up the coin. Money we want and money we will get. If you don't give up...you can lead your boy blind the rest of your days.

At 7:00 p.m. on the night of the 19th, Cudahy alone arrived at the lantern, which was located near the Little Papio Creek. He left the money along with a note in reply to the captors. He returned to the Cudahy mansion at 9:30 p.m. Eddie Jr. returned home at 1:00 a.m., unharmed.

== National response ==
Paying the kidnappers fueled a national debate. The San Francisco Examiner condemned the action: "Mr. Cudahy had acted as a bad citizen because it will encourage others." The Omaha Bee noted that Cudahy spoke in a "nonchalant tone" about paying the $25,000, as though he "had just dropped a nickel down a cellar grating."

== Manhunt ==
Cudahy posted a $25,000 reward and hired the Pinkerton Detective Agency to lead a manhunt, which the World-Herald called "the nation's leading thrill." After a statement from Eddie Jr., reporters found the kidnapper's hideout in South Omaha. Pat Crowe, a small butcher- shop operator in South Omaha, was identified as a suspect early in the investigation. However, nobody could find Crowe. During January 1901, Crowe sightings were reported from Central America to Nantucket Island, with one report placing him on a steamship in Honduras, and another at the Pine Ridge Indian Reservation in South Dakota. Thousands of "Crowe wanted" posters were shipped across the United States.

In March 1901, the Omaha City Council matched Cudahy's reward, and later in the month, a man named James Callahan was arrested for public drunkenness, his fine for which he paid with a shiny $20 gold coin, just like Cudahy had paid some of the ransom with. Callahan was also known to associate with Crowe. Police observed Callahan paying with the coins at taverns in Omaha, and on March 21, they arrested him for robbing Cudahy Sr. of $25,000. When he went to trial, he did not face kidnapping charges; Nebraska had none that applied to the kidnapping of a 16-year-old within city limits. While that soon changed, it did not change Callahan's trial, and on April 28, the jury found him not guilty of robbery. Another trial in November also found him not guilty.

Crowe communicated with the Omaha Police Department through the mail. Despite agreeing to turn himself in after negotiating the drop of the ransom in late 1901, Crowe never showed up. In the spring of 1905, he turned up in Omaha and gave an interview to a World-Herald reporter; however, he disappeared again. On September 5, 1905, he was spotted at a tavern in Little Bohemia; the ensuing gun fight left one police officer wounded, and Crowe vanished again.

== Capture and trial ==
In early November 1905, Crowe was captured by police in Butte, Montana. On November 28, 1905, Crowe pleaded not guilty to shooting the Omaha police officer in the September "Battle on Hickory Street". He was also charged with robbing a street car in Omaha of $50, and for robbery in the Cudahy kidnapping case. Despite four days of testimony from dozens of witnesses, the jury acquitted Crowe after 80 minutes of deliberations. The judge held him for the next trial, which began in February 1906; 92 witnesses were called by the prosecution, and none was called by the defense. The Chicago Examiner, following the case along with many national newspapers, proclaimed the defense's closing statement to be "considered the best speech in a criminal case ever made in Omaha." After 17 hours of deliberations on St. Patrick's Day, 1906, the jury declared Crowe not guilty. Responding to the trial, The Washington Post wrote, "Omaha is evidently a happy hunting ground for savages and malefactors."

== Aftermath ==
Crowe's criminal notoriety gained him fame as a lecturer, author, and actor across the United States, until he eventually died in poverty in Harlem in 1938. His written personal narratives of the story are studied today for their authenticity. The kidnapping influenced Omaha businessmen to keep their children under close watch, including tycoon Gurdon W. Wattles, who eventually moved to Hollywood to escape the tension in Omaha.

Cudahy's family moved from Omaha to Chicago in 1910. He served in World War I and married Margaret Carry in 1919. The couple had three children and later divorced in 1942. His wife died several months after the divorce. In 1944, Cudahy married Eleanor Peabody Cochran. He eventually became Chairman of the Board of Cudahy Packing, leading the company out of Omaha in the 1950s, and retiring to Arizona, where he died in 1966.

== See also ==
- Crime in Omaha
- History of Omaha
- List of kidnappings

== Related books ==
- Regan, T. (1927) Spreading Evil: Pat Crowe's Autobiography. Branwell Company.
