= Bill Cody (disambiguation) =

Bill Cody or William Cody may refer to:

- Bill Cody or "Buffalo Bill" (1846–1917), American frontiersman and showman
- Bill Cody (actor) (1891–1948), Hollywood B-movie actor
- Bill Cody (rugby union) (1892–1968), rugby union player who represented Australia
- Bill Cody (hurler) (1915–2001), Irish hurler
- William Francis Cody (1916–1978), American architect
- Bill Cody Jr. (1925–1989), child actor
- Bill Cody (American football) (* 1944), former National Football League linebacker
- Bill Cody (radio host) (1958–2026), American radio host
