= CODL =

CODL may refer to:

- Call of Duty League (CoDL), a pro esports league based on the video game Call of Duty (CoD)
- Constraints Driven Learning (CODL) in constrained conditional model
- College of Open Distance Learning (CODL), Eastern Visayas State University, Tacloban, Eastern Visayas, Philippines

== See also ==
- CDL (disambiguation)
- Codi (disambiguation)
- CoD1
