= Kidnapping of Charley Ross =

1874 kidnapping in Philadelphia, Pennsylvania

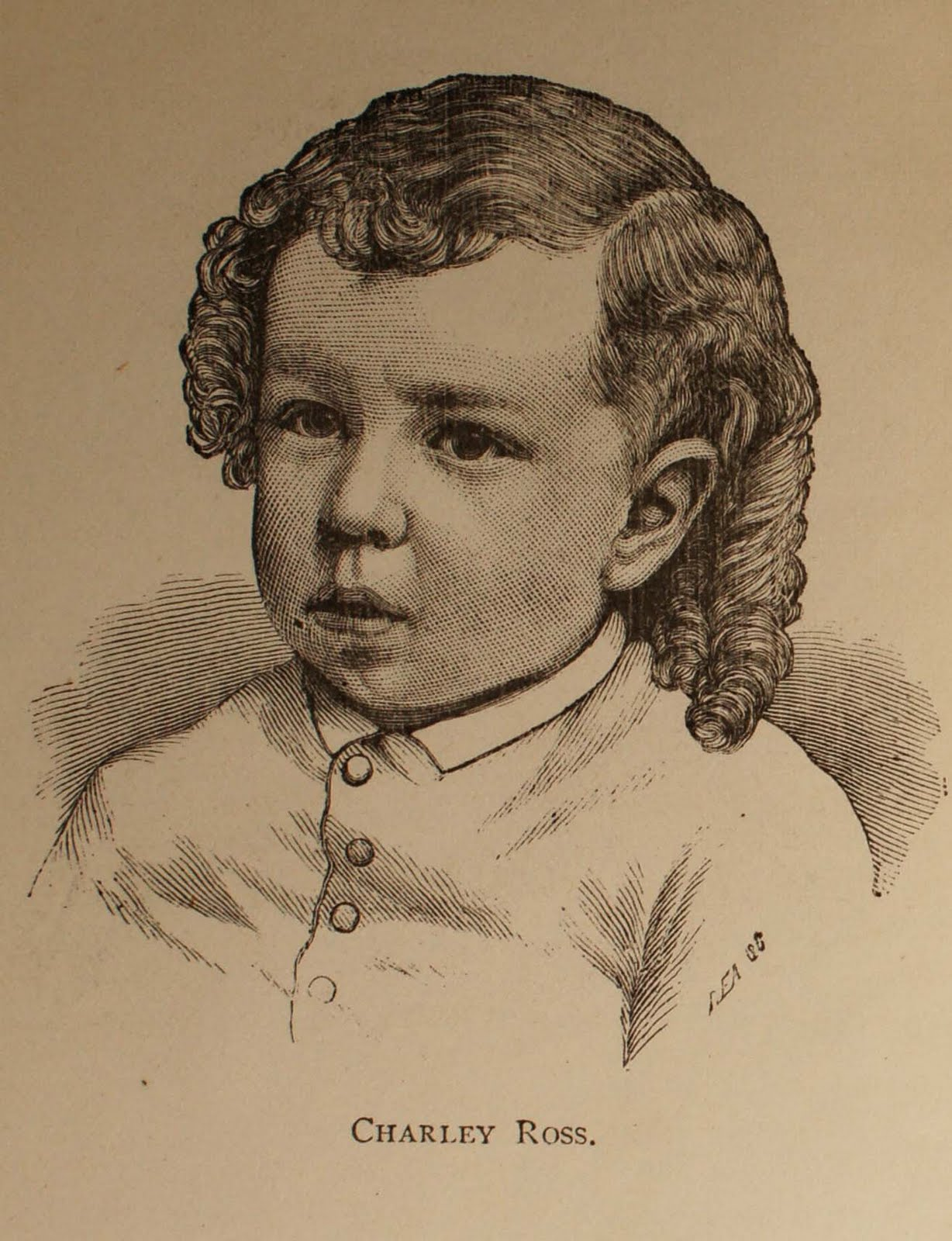
- 1874 likeness of Ross as published on his missing person poster
- Date: July 1, 1874; 152 years ago
- Location: Philadelphia, Pennsylvania, U.S.
- Type: Disappearance, kidnapping, child abduction, possible homicide
- Motive: Ransom
- Missing: Charles Brewster "Charley" Ross, aged 4
- Accused: Bill Mosher; Joe Douglas (gave deathbed confession); William Westervelt (accused of being an accomplice)
- Convicted: William Westervelt
- Charges: Kidnapping; Conspiracy
- Trial: Westervelt tried in 1875
- Verdict: Not guilty of kidnapping; Guilty of conspiracy
- Sentence: 6 years in prison

Charles Brewster "Charley" Ross (born May 4, 1870 – disappeared July 1, 1874) was the primary victim of the first American kidnapping for ransom to receive widespread media coverage. His fate remains unknown, and his case is one of the most famous disappearances in U.S. history.

== Abduction ==
On July 1, 1874, four-year-old Charley Ross and his five-year-old brother, Walter Lewis Ross, were playing in the front yard of their family's home in Germantown, a well-to-do section of Philadelphia, Pennsylvania. A horse-drawn carriage pulled up to the residence and the boys were approached by two men who offered candy and fireworks if they would take a ride with them. These two men were known to the boys, as they had been visiting with candy in the days preceding July 1. So the boys agreed, and were transported through Philadelphia to a store where Walter was directed to buy fireworks inside with 25 cents ($7.11 today) given to him. Walter did so, but the carriage left without him. Charley Ross was taken away and never seen again.

== Ransom ==
Christian K. Ross, the boys' father, began receiving ransom demands from the apparent kidnappers. They arrived in the form of notes mailed from post offices in Philadelphia and elsewhere, all written in an odd hand and in a coarse, semi-literate style with many simple words misspelled. The communications generally requested a ransom of $20,000 ($400,000 today). The notes cautioned against police intervention and threatened Charley's life if Christian did not cooperate. While the kidnappers had assumed the family was wealthy because of their large house and Christian's ownership of a small dry goods store, the truth was that the family was heavily in debt due to the stock market crash of 1873. Seeing no way to pay the ransom, Christian went to the police. The kidnapping soon became national news.

In addition to the heavy press coverage, some prominent Philadelphians enlisted the help of the famous Pinkerton National Detective Agency, who had millions of flyers and posters printed with Charley Ross's likeness. A popular song based on the crime was composed by Dexter Smith and W. H. Brockway, entitled "Bring Back Our Darling". Several attempts were made to provide the kidnappers with ransom money as dictated in the notes, but in each case the kidnappers failed to appear. Eventually, communication stopped.

== Suspects ==
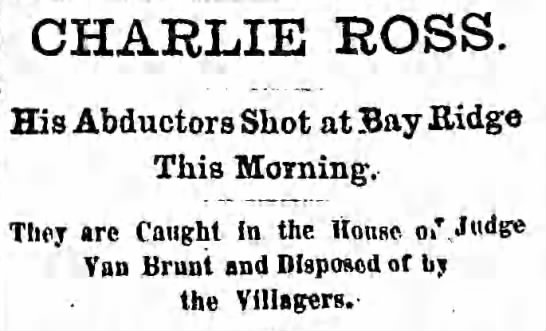
Headline in The Brooklyn Daily Eagle reporting the shooting at Judge Van Brunt's home

On the night of December 13, in Bay Ridge, Brooklyn, New York, the house belonging to Judge Charles Van Brunt was burgled. Holmes Van Brunt, Charles' brother who lived next door, gathered armed members of his household to stop the intruders in the act. Holmes's group entered Charles's house and brought down both burglars with a torrent of gunfire. The burglars, Bill Mosher and Joe Douglas, were career criminals who had recently been released from jail. Mosher was killed instantly from the gunfire. Douglas was mortally wounded, but managed to live approximately two more hours and was able to communicate with Holmes.

There is no clear consensus regarding exactly what Douglas said as he was dying, as all who were present to witness were too shaken by the night's events to give accurate reports. It is thought that Douglas may have said that lying was pointless, as he knew he was mortally wounded, and he for this reason admitted that he and Mosher had abducted Charley Ross. Douglas is believed to have reported that Ross had been killed, or that Mosher knew where the boy was, possibly adding that he would be returned unharmed to his family within a few days. Douglas did not give any clues to Ross's location or other particulars of the crime and died soon afterwards.

Charley's brother Walter was taken to New York City to look at the bodies of Mosher and Douglas so as to determine if they were the men from the carriage ride. Walter confirmed that they were the same men who had taken the boys from in front of their home the previous summer. Mosher in particular was very identifiable because he had a distinctively malformed nose, which Walter had described to police as a "monkey nose". (The cartilage of Mosher's nose had been destroyed by syphilis or cancer). For most, the issue of who the men in the carriage were was settled beyond reasonable doubt, but Charley Ross was still missing.

== Trial ==
Former Philadelphia policeman William Westervelt, a known associate of Mosher (and his wife's brother), was arrested and held in connection with the case. He was tried in 1875 for kidnapping. Although Westervelt was a friend and perhaps a confidant of Mosher (while in prison awaiting trial he had told Christian that his son had been alive at the time of Mosher's death), there was virtually no evidence to tie him to the crime itself. Walter, for one, insisted that Westervelt was not one of the men in the carriage that had taken them away. Westervelt was found not guilty of the kidnapping. However, he was found guilty of a lesser conspiracy charge and served six years in prison. He always maintained his own innocence and swore that he did not know the whereabouts of Charley Ross.

== Aftermath ==
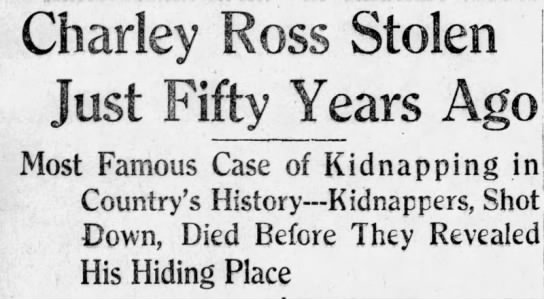
Headline in 1924 referencing the 1874 kidnapping

Two years after the kidnapping, Christian published a book on the case titled The Father's Story of Charley Ross, the Kidnapped Child in order to raise money to continue searching for his son. By 1878, the media interest in the case had begun to wane. To renew interest, Ross had the book reprinted and began giving lectures in Boston.

Christian and his wife continued to search for their son until their deaths (Christian died in 1897 and his wife in 1912). They followed leads and interviewed over 570 boys, teenagers, and eventually grown men from around the world who claimed to have been Charley. All proved to be imposters. The Rosses eventually spent approximately $60,000 looking for their son. In 1924, newspapers ran stories about the case to coincide with the 50th anniversary of Ross's abduction. By that time, Walter was an adult and was working as a stockbroker. In interviews, he said that he and his three sisters still received letters from middle-aged men claiming to be his brother.

The case, and in particular the fates of Mosher, Douglas, and Westervelt, served as a deterrent to other potential ransom kidnappers: it was a quarter of a century before another high-profile ransom kidnapping case emerged, with Edward Cudahy Jr. in 1900.

While waiting for President Franklin D. Roosevelt to appear at the 1936 Democratic National Convention concluding at Franklin Field in Philadelphia, newspaper columnist H. L. Mencken noted a prank had been played on a public address announcer by someone getting him to continually summon a "Charles Ross" to the press area.

The common admonition "don't take candy from strangers" is said to have come from Ross's abduction. The Charley Project, a major missing persons database, is named for Ross.

=== Gustave Blair claim ===
In 1934, Gustave Blair, a 69-year-old carpenter living in Phoenix, Arizona, petitioned a Maricopa County court to recognize him as the real Charley Ross. Blair claimed that after he was abducted, he lived in a cave and was eventually adopted by a man who told him he was Ross. Charley's older brother, Walter Ross, dismissed Blair as "a crank" and added, "The idea that my brother is still alive is not only absurd, but the man's story seems unconvincing. We've long ago given up hope that Charles ever would be found alive." As Blair's claim went uncontested, the court ruled that he was "Charles Brewster Ross" in March 1939. Despite the ruling, the Ross family refused to recognize Blair as their relative and did not bequeath him any money or property from their parents' estate. Blair briefly moved to Los Angeles and attempted to sell his life story to a film studio but was unsuccessful. He eventually moved to Germantown with his wife before moving back to Phoenix. Blair died in December 1943 still claiming that he was Ross.

Gustave Blair's victory in the Maricopa County courtroom was met with considerable skepticism but was reported at the time to have solved the disappearance of Charley Ross. In 2011, descendants of the family Blair claimed had adopted him commissioned a Y-DNA study, which disproved Blair's story. Following chain of custody procedures, DNA was collected from a male descendant of each of two suspected brothers, Harrison Miller and Nelson Miller (aka Gustave Blair). DNA analysis determined they had a "99.99903% probability of kinship" meaning they were, in fact, brothers. They shared the same paternal lineage, a perfect 37/37 7-STR marker match. Gustave Blair was born into the Miller family, not adopted, and as such could not have been Charley Ross.

== See also ==
- List of people who disappeared

== Bibliography ==
- Carrie Hagen, we is got him: The Kidnapping that Changed America ISBN 1590200861 (The Overlook Press, 2011)
- Christian Ross, The Father's Story of Charley Ross, the Kidnapped Child ISBN 1275753337 (John E. Potter, 1876)
- Ernest Kahlar Alix, Ransom Kidnapping in America, 1874–1974: The Creation of a Capital Crime ISBN 0809308495(Southern Illinois University Press, 1978
- Louis Solomon, Great Unsolved Crimes ISBN 0-590-03020-5 (Scholastic Book Services, 1976)
- Norman Zierold, Little Charley Ross OCLC 709440306 (Little, Brown & Company, 1967)
- William H. Westervelt (Defendant), E. E. Barclay Life, trial and conviction of William H. Westervelt, for the abduction of little Charley Ross ... OCLC 942285029 (Barclay & Co., Philadelphia, 1877)
