= Commander Cody (disambiguation) =

Commander Cody and His Lost Planet Airmen is a country rock band.

Commander Cody may also refer to:

- George Frayne, known as Commander Cody, lead singer of the band
- Commander Cody (Star Wars), a clone trooper from the Star Wars franchise

== See also ==
- Commando Cody, titular character of the eponymous 1950s science-fiction serial
  - Commando Cody: Sky Marshal of the Universe, a Republic Pictures multi-chapter movie serial which began as a proposed syndicated television series
- Space Patrol (1950 TV series), whose star character was Commander Corry
- Cody (disambiguation)
