= Dingo Bar =

Bar in Paris, France

Coordinates: 48.8419°N 2.3284°E

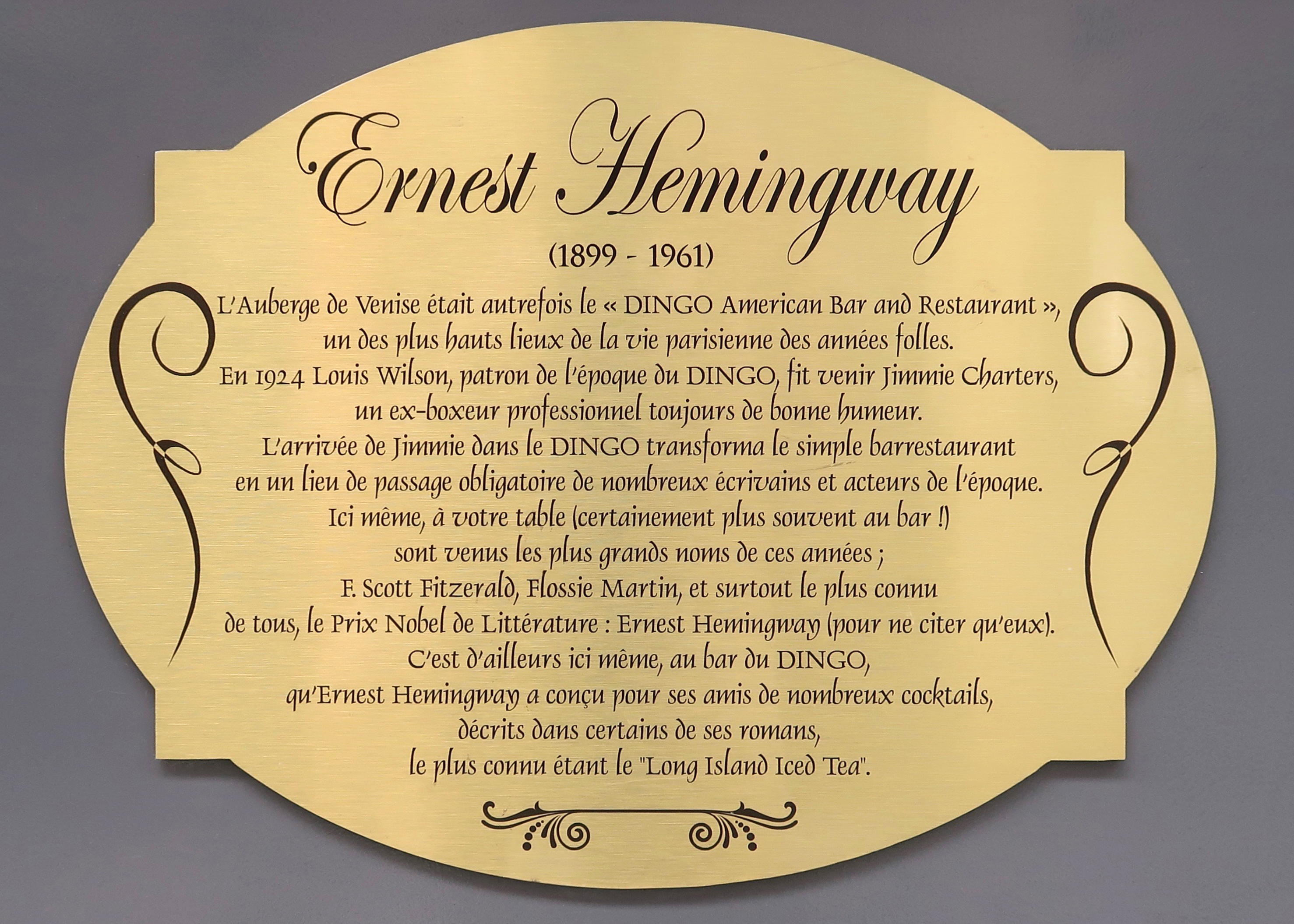
Commemorative plaque for Hemingway at rue Delambre

The Dingo American Bar and Restaurant at 10 rue Delambre in the Montparnasse Quarter of Paris, France opened its doors in 1923. Most commonly called the Dingo Bar, it was one of the few drinking establishments at the time that was open all night. It became the favorite haunt of the many English-speaking artists and writers who gathered in Paris during the 1920s and 1930s.

As recorded by Ernest Hemingway in his book A Moveable Feast, he first met F. Scott Fitzgerald at the Dingo Bar in late April 1925, two weeks after the publication of Fitzgerald's The Great Gatsby.

Others who frequented the Dingo Bar included Pablo Picasso, Aleister Crowley, Nancy Cunard, and Isadora Duncan, who would come over from her apartment across the street.

James "Jimmie" Charters, a former English lightweight boxer from Liverpool, was the highly popular barman at the Dingo and was responsible for much of its success. Charters' "This Must Be the Place; Memoirs of Montparnasse", edited by Morrill Cody with an introduction by Ernest Hemingway, was published in 1934. It was republished in 1937, and then again in 1989.

The premises that was home to the Dingo Bar remains, but today is occupied by L'Auberge de Venise, an Italian restaurant.
