= Joe Coady =

Irish hurler

Personal information
- Native name: Seosamh Mac Oda (Irish)
- Born: 1934 Waterford, Ireland
- Died: August 2008 (aged 74) Waterford, Ireland
- Occupation: Mill worker
- Height: 5 ft 9 in (175 cm)

Sport
- Sport: Hurling
Club
- Years: Club
- Erin's Own
Club titles
- Waterford titles: 1
Inter-county
- Years: County
- Waterford
Inter-county titles
- Munster titles: 1
- All-Irelands: 1
- NHL: 0

Joseph Coady (1934 - 5 August 2008) was an Irish hurler who played for club side Erin's Own and at inter-county level with the Waterford senior hurling team.

== Honours ==
Erin's Own

- Waterford Senior Hurling Championship (1): 1962

Waterford

- All-Ireland Senior Hurling Championship (1): 1959
- Munster Senior Hurling Championship (1): 1959
