= Kodi =

Kodi may refer to:

== Arts, entertainment, and media ==
- KODI, a radio station in Cody, Wyoming, USA
- Kodi (film), India, 2016
- Kodi, a dog in the 2004 film Balto III: Wings of Change

== Other uses ==
- Kodi (software), an open source media center application
- Kodi, India, a village in the state of Karnataka
- Kodi language, a Sumba language of Indonesia
- Kodi Smit-McPhee (born 1996), Australian actor
- Aina Hanganeni Kodi, Namibian politician

== See also ==
- Codi (disambiguation)
- Cody (disambiguation)
