= Matt Cody =

Australian rules footballer

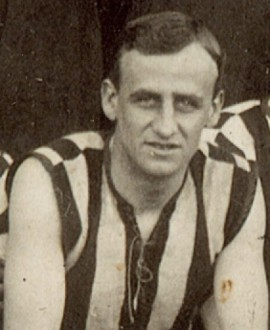

Personal information
- Full name: Matthew Joseph Cody
- Born: 28 February 1895; Richmond, Victoria
- Died: 10 January 1974 (aged 78); East Melbourne, Victoria
- Original team: Kew
- Height: 174 cm (5 ft 9 in)
- Weight: 74 kg (163 lb)

Playing career^{1}
Years	Club	Games (Goals)
1916–17	Collingwood	12 (2)
- ^{1} Playing statistics correct to the end of 1917.

Matthew Joseph Cody (28 February 1895 – 10 January 1974) was a former Australian rules footballer who played with Collingwood in the Victorian Football League (VFL).
