= Codey =

Codey is an English given name and surname. Notable people with the name include:

== Given name ==
- Codey Maus (born 1985), Canadian curler
- Codey McElroy (born 1992), American football player
- Codey Rei (born 1989), New Zealand rugby union player

== Surname ==
- David Codey (born 1957), Australian rugby union player
- Mary Jo Codey (born 1955), American healthcare activist
- Richard Codey (1946–2026), American politician

== See also ==
- Cody (given name)
- Cody (surname)
