= Rich Coady (center) =

American football player (born 1944)

No. 87, 37, 52
- Positions: Center, Tight end

Personal information
- Born: December 17, 1944 (age 81); Chicago, Illinois, U.S.
- Listed height: 6 ft 3 in (1.91 m)
- Listed weight: 245 lb (111 kg)

Career information
- High school: Taft (Chicago)
- College: Memphis (1963-1966)
- NFL draft: 1968: 11th round, 289th overall pick

Career history
- Norfolk Neptunes (1969); Chicago Bears (1970–1974)

Career NFL statistics
- Receptions: 6
- Receiving yards: 44
- Touchdowns: 1
- Stats at Pro Football Reference

Richard Joseph Coady Jr. (born December 17, 1944) is an American former professional football player who was a center and tight end in the National Football League (NFL). He was selected by the Chicago Bears in the 11th round of the 1968 NFL/AFL draft. He played college football for the Memphis Tigers. His son Rich Coady also played in the NFL.
