= Cody Miles =

American rapper (born 1991)

- Born: Cody Thornton-Miles; April 5, 1991 (age 35); Austin, Texas, US
- Origin: Austin, Texas, US
- Genres: Hip hop
- Occupations: Rapper, MC, songwriter
- Years active: 2010–present
- Label: Saiza Inc Records
- Website: www.kenosismusic.com

Cody Thornton-Miles (born April 5, 1991) is an American hip hop from Austin, Texas. Cody Miles works with Tim Saiza (producer) and Michael Rodgers (vocals).

== Career ==
He is currently signed to Saiza Inc Records.

=== 2012: Apocrypha ===
Apocrypha, the first solo EP from Cody Miles, was produced by Munich Germany producer Mista Min and also featured production from Austin producer Skeliskel. It received recognition on the Houston Chronicle when it was released in April 2012. It received moderate ratings from reviewers. The album allowed him to open for Beautiful Eulogy in 2012 at Sam Houston State University. The album features the single "Simple Man" with Manchild and has been featured on the City of Georgetown's Facebook.

=== 2013–Present: If We Must Die ===
If We Must Die the first full-length studio album from Cody Miles, is scheduled for release in mid-2013. The album is produced by Saiza Inc Records producer Tim Saiza and features samples from Johnny Cash, Michael Jackson, Gloria Gaynor, Barry White, Red Hot Chili Peppers, Paul McCartney and Wings, The Who, Pink Floyd and Metallica. It is reported to feature hip-hop artists Heath McNease, Irrelevant and Manchild.

== Discography ==
Album information
Transidentity
- Released: 2010
- Label: Saiza Inc. Records
Apocrypha
- Released: 2012
- Label: Independent
- Singles: "Simple Man featuring Manchild"
