= Cody Trahan =

American softball player (born 1988)

Personal information
- Born: 1988 (age 37–38) Orange, Texas, U.S.
- Height: 6 ft 0 in (1.83 m)

Sport
- Country: USA
- Sport: Softball
- College team: LSU

Cody Michelle Trahan (born 1988) is an American softball player. She attended Little Cypress-Mauriceville High School in Orange, Texas, graduating in 2006. She later attended Louisiana State University, where she pitched on the LSU Tigers softball team. Trahan led the Tigers to four consecutive NCAA tournament appearances, where they advanced as far as the Super Regionals in 2007.
