= Cody Martin =

Cody Martin may refer to:

- Zack and Cody Martin, fictional characters from the TV series The Suite Life of Zack & Cody
- Cody Martin (baseball) (born 1989), American baseball pitcher
- Cody Martin (basketball) (born 1995), American basketball player
