= John Cody (disambiguation) =

John Cody (1907–1982) was an American archbishop.

John Cody may also refer to:

- John Cody (union leader) (1921–2001), American unionist
- John Cody (Survivor), American contestant of Survivor: Blood vs. Water
- John Donald Cody (born 1947), American criminal

== See also ==
- Henry John Cody (1868–1951), Canadian academic administrator
