= Cody Thompson =

Cody Thompson may refer to:

- Cody Thompson (politician) (born 1987)
- Cody Thompson (American football) (born 1996)
