= Cody Walker =

Cody Walker may refer to:

- Cody Walker (poet) (born 1967), American poet
- Cody Walker (actor), American actor
- Cody Walker (rugby league) (born 1990), Australian rugby league player
- Cody Walker (rugby union) (born 1997), Australian rugby union player
