= Cody Clark =

Cody Clark may refer to:

- Cody Clark (American football) (1882–1931), American football player
- Cody Clark (baseball) (born 1981), American baseball player
