= Richard Dickson Cudahy =

American judge (1926–2015)

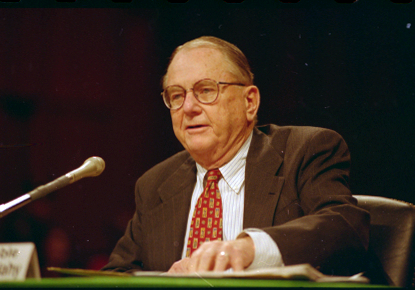
- Cudahy in 1999

Senior Judge of the United States Court of Appeals for the Seventh Circuit
- In office August 15, 1994 – September 22, 2015

Judge of the United States Court of Appeals for the Seventh Circuit
- In office September 26, 1979 – August 15, 1994
- Appointed by: Jimmy Carter
- Preceded by: Seat established by 92 Stat. 1629
- Succeeded by: Terence T. Evans

Chair of the Democratic Party of Wisconsin
- In office June 10, 1967 – July 15, 1968
- Preceded by: Louis Hanson
- Succeeded by: James W. Wimmer

Personal details
- Born: February 2, 1926 Milwaukee, Wisconsin, U.S.
- Died: September 22, 2015 (aged 89) Winnetka, Illinois, U.S.
- Resting place: Holy Cross Catholic Cemetery, Calumet City, Illinois
- Party: Democratic
- Spouses: Ann Catherine Featherston (m. 1930; died 1974); Janet (Schleeper) Stuart (m. 1976–2015)
- Children: 7
- Parents: Michael Francis Cudahy (father); Alice (Dickson) Cudahy (mother)
- Relatives: Patrick Cudahy (grandfather)
- Education: United States Military Academy (BS); Yale University (JD)
- Profession: Businessman, jurist, politician

Military service
- Allegiance: United States
- Branch/service: United States Air Force
- Years of service: 1948–1951
- Rank: Lieutenant

Richard Dickson Cudahy Sr. (February 2, 1926 – September 22, 2015) was an American business executive, law professor, politician, and judge. He served 15 years as a judge of the U.S. 7th Circuit Court of Appeals; he was appointed by President Jimmy Carter in 1979 and took senior status in 1994. Prior to his service in the federal judiciary, Cudahy was C.E.O. of Patrick Cudahy, Inc., the meat-packing company founded by his grandfather and grand-uncle, Patrick and John Cudahy. He also served one year as chairman of the Democratic Party of Wisconsin, and served on Wisconsin's influential Public Service Commission.

== Education and career ==
newspaper advertisement for Cudahy's 1968 attorney general campaign

Born in Milwaukee, Wisconsin, Cudahy was educated at the Canterbury School and received a Bachelor of Science degree from the United States Military Academy at West Point, New York in 1948, and a Juris Doctor from Yale Law School in 1955. He was a Lieutenant in the United States Air Force from 1948 to 1951. He was a law clerk for Judge Charles Edward Clark of the United States Court of Appeals for the Second Circuit from 1955 to 1956. He was an assistant to the legal adviser for the United States Department of State from 1956 to 1957. He was in private practice in Chicago, Illinois, from 1957 to 1960. He was a President and C.E.O. of Patrick Cudahy, Inc., Cudahy and Milwaukee, Wisconsin from 1961 to 1971. He returned to private practice in Milwaukee in 1972, serving also as a member and chairman of the Public Service Commission of Wisconsin from 1972 to 1975, then continuing his private practice in Washington, D.C., from 1976 to 1979. He also taught as a lecturer at Marquette University Law School from 1961 to 1966, as a visiting professor of law at the University of Wisconsin Law School from 1966 to 1967, and as a lecturer at the George Washington University Law School from 1976 to 1979.

== Federal judicial service ==
On May 22, 1979, Cudahy was nominated by President Jimmy Carter to a new seat on the United States Court of Appeals for the Seventh Circuit, created by 92 Stat. 1629, 1632. He was confirmed by the United States Senate on September 25, 1979, and received his commission on September 26, 1979. He assumed senior status on August 15, 1994. His service terminated on September 22, 2015, due to his death.

In 2000, two members of Congress complained that Cudahy leaked confidential information prior to the presidential nomination of Al Gore.

== Personal life ==
Richard Cudahy married Ann Featherston on July 14, 1956, at Deal, New Jersey. They had seven children together before Ann's death in 1974. In 1976, Cudahy married for a second time, marrying Dr. Janet Stuart (née Schleeper), the widow of Dr. Karl Stuart.

Richard Cudahy died on September 22, 2015, at his home in Winnetka, Illinois.

== Notable decisions ==
- Leibovitz v. Paramount Pictures Corp., 137 F.3d 109 (2d Cir. 1998)
- MCI Communications Corp. v. American Tel. and Tel. Co. 708 F.2d 1081 (7th Cir. 1983)
- Brownmark Films, LLC v. Comedy Partners, 682 F.3d 687 (7th Cir. 2012)
- World Outreach Conference Center and Pamela Blossom v. City of Chicago, Nos. 13-3669, 13-3728 (2d Cir. June 1, 2015)

Party political offices
Preceded by Louis Hanson	Chair of the Democratic Party of Wisconsin; 1967–1968	Succeeded by James W. Wimmer
Preceded by Bronson La Follette	Democratic nominee for Attorney General of Wisconsin; 1968	Succeeded by Thomas M. Jacobson
Legal offices
Seat established by 92 Stat. 1629	Judge of the United States Court of Appeals for the Seventh Circuit; 1979–1994	Succeeded by Terence T. Evans
