= Cody Campbell =

Cody Campbell may refer to:

- Cody Campbell (bull rider), professional bull rider, Built Ford Tough Series
- Cody Campbell (businessman), American energy investor, former American football player, and major Texas Tech University booster
- Cody Campbell, ice hockey player in 2009–10 Alabama–Huntsville Chargers ice hockey season
