= Cody Blackbird =

- Instrument: Native American flute
- Years active: 2010–present

Cody Thomas Blackbird is a former musician, best known for playing the Native American flute. With the Cody Blackbird Band, composed of himself, his brother Caleb, Xavier Torres and Lewis Schenk, Blackbird released All In in 2016.
