= Kristin Cody =

American acoustical engineer

Kristin Lai-Fook Cody is an American acoustical engineer who has worked for the Knolls Atomic Power Laboratory, Bechtel and the Naval Nuclear Laboratory.

Cody is the daughter of biomedical engineer Stephen J. Lai-Fook of the University of Kentucky. As a student at Purdue University in the 1990s, she served on the editorial board of Purdue Engineering Magazine. After graduating with a bachelor's degree in mechanical engineering from Purdue, she received a master's degree in the same subject at the Rensselaer Polytechnic Institute. She completed her Ph.D. in acoustics in 2008 at the Pennsylvania State University, supervised by Stephen A. Hambric.

She is a Fellow of the Institute of Noise Control Engineering of the USA, recognized for her service as a vice president of the institute, for her research on noise control engineering, flow noise, and flow-induced vibration, and for teaching about noise and vibration in her organization. In 2021 she was elected as an ASME Fellow.
