= Michael Cody =

Irish hurler

Personal information
- Native name: Mícheál Mac Oda (Irish)
- Born: 20 June 1997 (age 29) Dunnamaggin, County Kilkenny, Ireland
- Occupation: Student
- Height: 6 ft 1 in (185 cm)

Sport
- Sport: Hurling
- Position: Right corner-back
Club
- Years: Club
- Dunnamaggin
Club titles
- Kilkenny titles: 0
College
- Years: College
- 2015-present: University College Dublin
College titles
- Fitzgibbon titles: 0
Inter-county*
Years	County	Apps (scores)
2019-	Kilkenny	0 (0-00)
Inter-county titles
- Leinster titles: 0
- All-Irelands: 0
- NHL: 0
- All Stars: 0
- *Inter County team apps and scores correct as of 16:54, 2 April 2019.

Michael Cody (born 20 June 1997) is an Irish hurler who plays for Kilkenny Intermediate Championship club Dunnamaggin and at inter-county level with the Kilkenny senior hurling team. He usually lines out as a right corner-back.

== Career statistics ==
As of match played 16 March 2019.

Team	Year	National League			Leinster		All-Ireland		Total	
Team	Year	Division	Apps	Score	Apps	Score	Apps	Score	Apps	Score
Kilkenny	2019	Division 1A	1	0-00	0	0-00	0	0-00	1	0-00
Career total			1	0-00	0	0-00	0	0-00	1	0-00

== Honours ==
St. Kieran's College

- All-Ireland Colleges Senior Hurling Championship (2): 2014, 2015
- Leinster Colleges Senior Hurling Championship (1): 2015

Dunnamaggin

- All-Ireland Junior Club Hurling Championship (1): 2019
- Leinster Junior Club Hurling Championship (1): 2018
- Kilkenny Junior Hurling Championship (1): 2018

Kilkenny

- Leinster Under-21 Hurling Championship (1): 2017
- Leinster Minor Hurling Championship (1): 2015
