= Bill Cody (rugby union) =

- Born: Ernest Austin Stanislaus Cody; 1892 Melbourne, Victoria
- Died: 30 December 1968
- School: St Joseph's College

Rugby union career
- Position: flanker
International career
Years	Team	Apps	(Points)
1913	Wallabies	3	(0)

Ernest Austin Stanislaus "Bill" Cody (1892 – 30 December 1968) was a rugby union player who represented Australia.

Cody, a flanker, was born in Melbourne, Victoria, the son of Johnathon Francis Cody and his wife, Pauline Mary (née O'Callaghan). He attended St. Patrick's College from 1901 to 1903. He claimed a total of 3 international rugby caps for Australia in 1913.

Cody later worked as a clerk. During the First World War, he enlisted in 1916 as a gunner in the Australian Imperial Force, and rose to the rank of lieutenant upon returning to Australia in 1919.

== Published sources ==
- Howell, Max (2006) Born to Lead - Wallaby Test Captains (2005) Celebrity Books, New Zealand
