= Codie Prevost =

Canadian country music artist

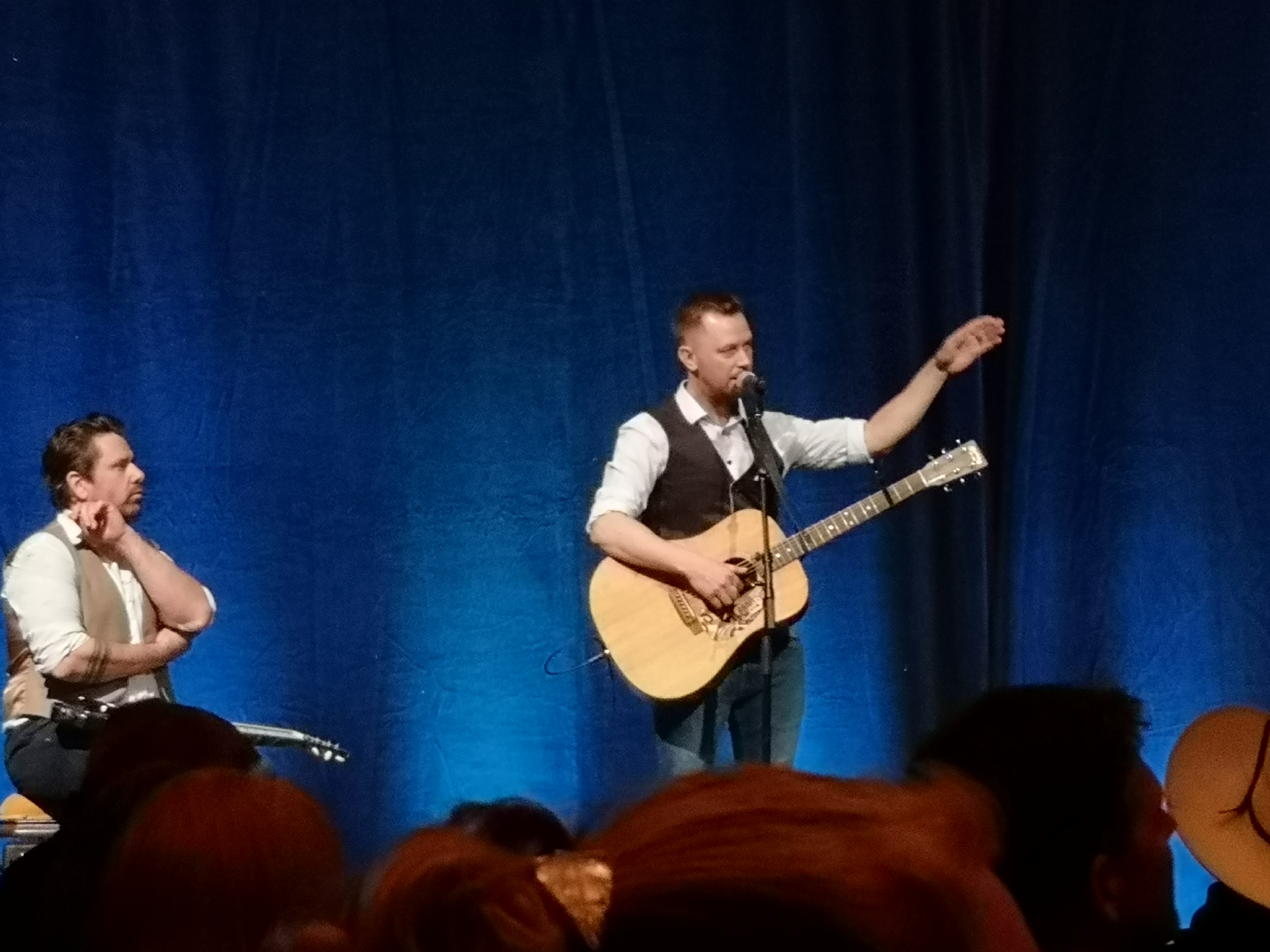
- Prevost at 2019 SCMA Awards

Background information
- Born: December 19, 1984 (age 40)
- Origin: Archerwill, Saskatchewan, Canada
- Genres: Country, Country rock
- Occupation: Singer-songwriter
- Instrument: Guitar
- Years active: 2005–present
- Labels: Good Spirit Records
- Website: codieprevost.com

Codie Prevost (born December 19, 1984) is a Canadian country music artist. He is a four time Canadian Country Music Association (CCMA) nominee and a six time Saskatchewan Country Music Association (SCMA) Entertainer of the Year and Male Vocalist of the Year winner. In total, he has received 26 SCMA Awards. Prevost's past performances include CMA Music Festival, Dauphin Countryfest, South by Southwest, American Tours Festival, Havelock Country Jamboree, Craven Country Jamboree and Manitoulin Island Country Fest.

Prevost released two full-length albums and one EP on his own label, Good Spirit Records. He started his climb onto the country music scene in 2005 after recording his debut album, The Road Ahead. In 2010, he released his second album, Get Loud, which helped him to earn the SCMA awards for Entertainer of the Year and Male Vocalist of the Year. Nashville Music Guide rated the album with 6 out of 7 stars. He has since been nominated for the Canadian Country Music Association Rising Star Award in both 2011 and 2012. Prevost was selected as one of the Top 12 out of 7,500 artists in the world in the Unsigned Only Competition. He has four official music videos on CMT, the most recent video being his latest single "Last Night All Day." He has been featured on ET Canada and has opened for Joe Nichols, The Oak Ridge Boys and Florida Georgia Line. He was nominated at the CCMA Awards for Interactive Artist of the Year in 2013.

== Discography ==
=== Studio albums ===
Title	Details
The Road Ahead	Release date: July 15, 2005; Label: Good Spirit Records
Get Loud	Release date: June 22, 2010; Label: Good Spirit Records
All Kinds of Crazy	Release date: March 1, 2014; Label: Good Spirit Records

=== Extended plays ===
Title	Details
Spin 6-Pak Vol. 1	Release date: 2008; Label: Good Spirit Records

=== Singles ===
Year	Single	Peak positions	Album
Year	Single	CAN Country	Album
2005	"Not Just the Beer Talkin'"	—	The Road Ahead
2005	"The Road Ahead"	—	The Road Ahead
2006	"He's Not Me"	—	The Road Ahead
2006	"A Million Miles Away"	—	The Road Ahead
2007	"Shinin' River"	—	The Road Ahead
2007	"Next Weekend"	—	The Road Ahead
2008	"Spin"	—	Spin 6-Pak Vol. 1
2008	"Good Livin'"	—	Spin 6-Pak Vol. 1
2009	"Call Me When You Get There"	—	Spin 6-Pak Vol. 1
2009	"One of Those Days"	—	Spin 6-Pak Vol. 1
2009	"Breathtaking"	—	Spin 6-Pak Vol. 1
2010	"Rolling Back to You"	—	Get Loud
2010	"Standing Still"	—	Get Loud
2011	"Cruising Song"	—	Get Loud
2011	"Honky Tonk Groupie"	—	Get Loud
2012	"Finish What He Started"	—	Get Loud
2012	"Last Night All Day"	—	All Kinds of Crazy
2014	"Someday"	43	All Kinds of Crazy
2014	"All Kinds of Crazy"	—	All Kinds of Crazy
2014	"Say My Name"	—	All Kinds of Crazy
2015	"Down the Line"	—	All Kinds of Crazy
"—" denotes releases that did not chart

=== Guest singles ===
Year	Single	Artist	Album
2015	"You Brought the Party"	Samara Yung	This Is Me

=== Music videos ===
Year	Video	Director
2010	"Rolling Back to You"	Anthony J. Vanden Berghe
2010	"Standing Still"	Anthony J. Vanden Berghe
2011	"Honky Tonk Groupie"	Troy Niemans
2012	"Finish What He Started"	
2012	"Last Night All Day"	Liam Richards
2014	"Someday"	Liam Richards
2014	"All Kinds of Crazy"	Liam Richards
2015	"Down the Line"	Liam Richards
2015	"You Brought the Party" (with Samara Yung)	David Pichette

== Awards and nominations ==
Year	Association	Category	Result
2015	Saskatchewan Country Music Association	Song of the Year – Someday	Won
2015	Saskatchewan Country Music Association	Male Vocalist of the Year	Won
2014	Canadian Country Music Awards	Album of the Year – All Kinds of Crazy	Nominated
2014	Saskatchewan Country Music Association	Fan's Choice Entertainer of the Year	Won
2014	Saskatchewan Country Music Association	Male Vocalist of the Year	Won
2014	Saskatchewan Country Music Association	SCMA Achievement Award	Won
2014	Western Canadian Music Awards	Country Recording of the Year – All Kinds of Crazy	Won
2013	Saskatchewan Country Music Association	Entertainer of the Year	Won
2013	Saskatchewan Country Music Association	Male Vocalist of the Year	Won
2013	Canadian Country Music Awards	Interactive Artist of the Year	Nominated
2012	Saskatchewan Country Music Association	Entertainer of the Year	Won
2012	Saskatchewan Country Music Association	Male Vocalist of the Year	Won
2012	Saskatchewan Country Music Association	Video of the Year – "Honky Tonk Groupie"	Won
2012	Canadian Country Music Awards	Rising Star	Nominated
2011	Saskatchewan Country Music Association	Entertainer of the Year	Won
2011	Saskatchewan Country Music Association	Male Vocalist of the Year	Won
2011	Saskatchewan Country Music Association	Song of the Year (Composer: Codie Prevost and Adam Wheeler for "I'm Okay")	Won
2011	Saskatchewan Country Music Association	Single of the Year – "Rolling Back to You"	Won
2011	Saskatchewan Country Music Association	Video of the Year – "Standing Still"	Won
2011	Saskatchewan Country Music Association	Album of the Year – Get Loud	Won
2011	Saskatchewan Country Music Association	Back Up Band of the Year – Codie Prevost Band	Won
2011	Canadian Country Music Awards	Rising Star	Nominated
2010	Lieutenant Governor's Arts Award	Arts	Nominated
2010	Independent Music Awards	Best Country Song	Won
