= Rich Coady (defensive back) =

American football player (born 1976)

No. 38, 29, 25
- Position: Safety

Personal information
- Born: January 26, 1976 (age 50); Dallas, Texas, U.S.
- Listed height: 6 ft 1 in (1.85 m)
- Listed weight: 210 lb (95 kg)

Career information
- High school: Richardson (TX) Pearce
- College: Texas A&M
- NFL draft: 1999: 3rd round, 68th overall pick

Career history
- St. Louis Rams (1999–2001); Tennessee Titans (2002); Indianapolis Colts (2003)*; St. Louis Rams (2003–2004); Atlanta Falcons (2005)*; Dallas Cowboys (2005)*
- * Offseason or practice squad member only

Awards and highlights
- Super Bowl champion (XXXIV); First-team All-Big 12 (1998)

Career NFL statistics
- Total tackles: 131
- Sacks: 1
- Defensive touchdowns: 1
- Forced fumbles: 2
- Fumble recoveries: 2
- Interceptions: 2
- Pass deflections: 8
- Stats at Pro Football Reference

Richard Joseph Coady, IV (born January 26, 1976) is an American former professional football player who was a safety in the National Football League (NFL). His father Rich Coady played in the NFL for the Chicago Bears.

== Early life ==
Coady attended J. J. Pearce High School in Richardson, Texas and was a student and a letterman in football and basketball. In football, as a senior, he was named his team's Most Valuable Player and was an All-District selection and an All-Metroplex selection.

== College career ==
Coady attended Texas A&M University, where he was a three-year starter for the Aggies. Originally came to Texas A&M as a non-scholarship athlete and worked his way into the starting lineup, starting 39 games in a row and becoming an integral part of the Aggies' 1998 Big 12 Conference championship team. Led the A&M secondary in tackles for three straight seasons and had eight career interceptions.

As a senior Coady was First-team All-Big 12 and made 86 tackles (57 solo) and had three interceptions. The year before he made 93 tackles (64 solo) and made two interceptions. In 1996, as a sophomore, he had 64 tackles (42) solo and three interceptions. As a freshman Coady was a reserve safety and made 23 tackles (12 solo).

== Professional career ==
=== Pre-draft ===
Pre-draft measurables
Height	Weight	40-yard dash	10-yard split	20-yard split	20-yard shuttle	Three-cone drill	Vertical jump	Broad jump	Bench press	Wonderlic
6 ft 0 5/8 in (1.84 m)	195 lb (88 kg)	4.55 s	1.58 s	2.64 s	3.88 s	7.11 s	36 in (0.91 m)	9 ft 11 in (3.02 m)	20 reps	×
All values from NFL Combine.

His stock rose quickly in the draft due to his workout at the NFL Combine where he tested with a 4.55 40-yard dash, 20 reps of 225 lb (102 kg). on the bench press, a 36" vertical jump and 3.88 seconds in the 20-yard shuttle. He also posted a 330 lb. power clean, 360 lb. bench press and a 450 lb. squat

=== St. Louis Rams (first stint) ===
He was selected by the St. Louis Rams in the third round of the 1999 NFL draft. On July 17, 1999, Coady signed a four-year $1.2 million contract with the club. He won a Super Bowl ring in Super Bowl XXXIV, his rookie year playing as a reserve safety. He started two games in both 2000 and 2001 due to injuries to the starters. He played three years in St. Louis and was released August 28, 2002.

=== Tennessee Titans ===
On August 30, 2002, the Tennessee Titans claimed Coady and signed him to a one-year $890,000 contract. In the 2002 season Coady played 14 games and started two for the third year in a row. He made 19 tackles and intercepted one pass which he returned 24 yards for a touchdown. He also forced a fumble and deflected three passes.

=== Indianapolis Colts ===
Coady signed a one-year $555,000 contract with Indianapolis as a free agent On March 7, 2003.

=== St. Louis Rams (second stint) ===
In the training camp of 2003 the Rams had several injuries at the safety position and Coady was familiar with their system so on August 30, 2003, the Rams traded a conditional seventh-round draft pick to the Colts for Coady, less than six months after signing him as an unrestricted free agent. In 2003 Coady played 13 games and starting five with 41 tackles. On March 24, 2004, the Rams signed Coady to a one-year $561,000 contract for the 2004 season. He played in 16 games and starting five and making 44 tackles. The Rams did not offer Coady a contract for 2005, making him a free agent.

=== Later career ===
Coady was signed by the Atlanta Falcons on March 7, 2005, but was subsequently cut in August 2005.

On August 24, 2005 Coady was signed by the Dallas Cowboys and less than two weeks later he was waived.

He worked out with the New Orleans Saints prior to the 2006 season, but was not signed.
