= Colonel Cody =

Colonel Cody may refer to:

- William Frederick "Buffalo Bill" Cody, American soldier and showman
- Samuel Franklin Cody, Wild West showman and early pioneer of manned flight
