= Kathleen Cody =

Kathleen Cody may refer to:

- Kathleen Cody (actress) (born 1954), American actress
- Kathleen Cody (camogie), Irish former camogie player
