= Morrill Cody =

American diplomat, literary editor, and author

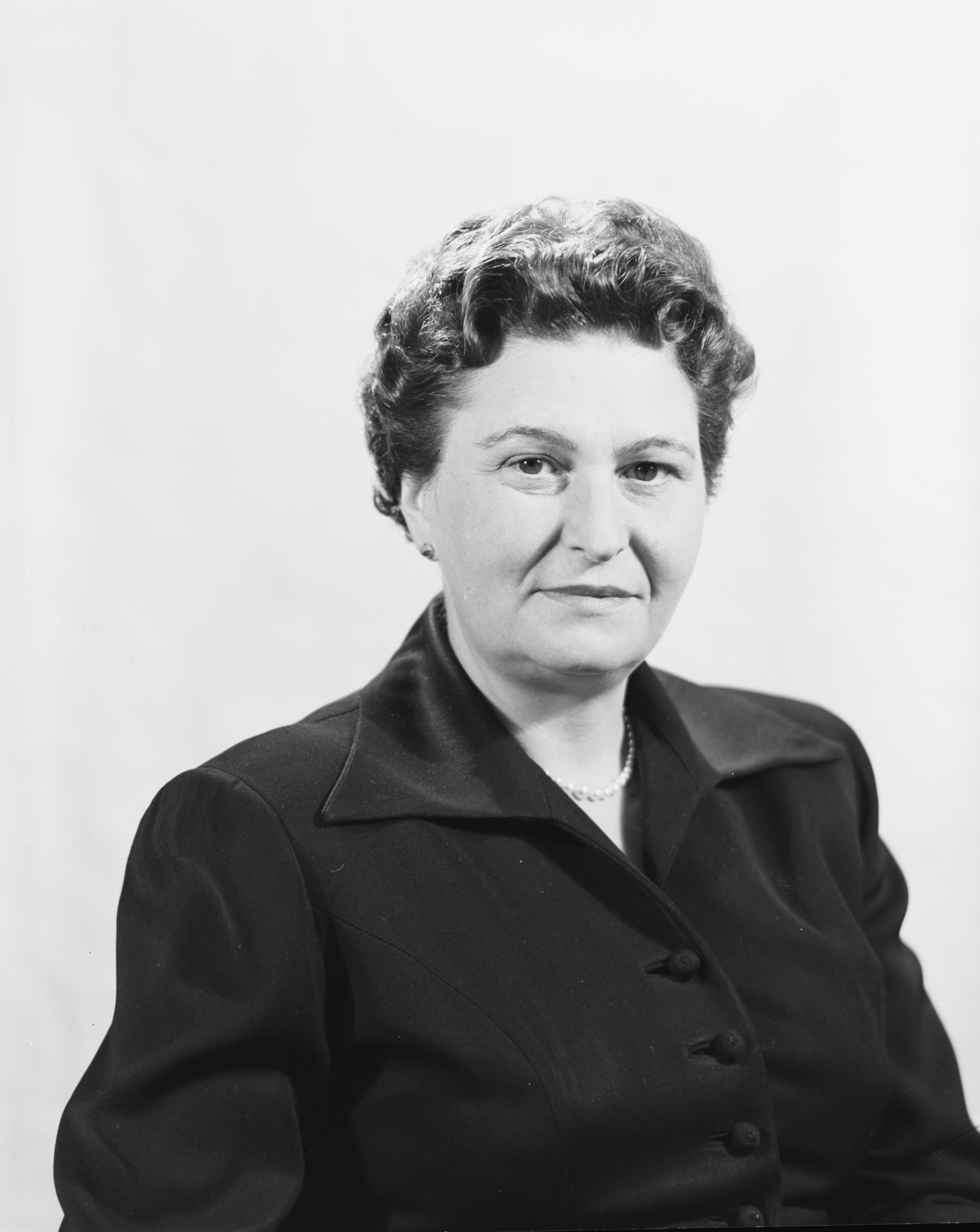
- Portrait of Morrill Cody
- Born: April 10, 1901
- Died: November 23, 1987 (aged 86)
- Occupations: Diplomat, Author

Morrill Cody (April 10, 1901 – November 23, 1987) was an American diplomat, literary editor, and author. Cody served with the United States Foreign Service for more than two decades and was a former deputy director of the United States Information Agency from 1961 to 1963 under Edward R. Murrow. From 1965 to 1976 he managed the Paris bureau of Radio Free Europe.

The author of several books, he edited the 1934 book This Must be the Place: Memoirs of Montparnasse by James "Jimmie" Charters↓*, the highly popular barman at the Dingo Bar in the Montparnasse Quarter of Paris during the Années Folles (the Crazy Years) in the 1920s.

Morrill Cody was born in Lake Forest, Illinois and died in a nursing home in Wheaton, Maryland after a lengthy illness. He graduated from Amherst College in 1921.

- ↑"This Must Be the Place; Memoirs of Montparnasse."

Jimmy Charters served as barman at several Parisian establishments including the Dingo, the Falstaff, the Trois et As and the Jockey. Charters did not compose the memoir himself, but instead dictated impressions of and stories about his various clients to a stenographer hired by his collaborator Morrill Cody, an American journalist (and later cultural liaison) who also participated in Left Bank expatriate circles. According to Cody, Charters undertook the memoir at the urging of American artist Hilaire Hiler, who served as Charters' initial ghost writer before he (Hiler) persuaded Cody to take over. The resultant text first appeared as "This Must Be the Place; Memoirs of Montparnasse by Jimmy the Barman (James Charters); edited by Morrill Cody; with an introduction by Ernest Hemingway; illustrated by Ivan Opffer and Hilaire Hiler," published in England by Herbert Joseph Ltd. in 1934. Lee Furman, Inc. brought out an American edition in 1937. Hugh D. Ford, who wrote the foreword for the 1989 Collier Books reprint, recounts that Hemingway agreed so long as he liked the contents. Hemingway looked over an early and rough version of the text with Cody and Charters at Shakespeare and Company while on his way from Key West to Africa in November 1933. Hemingway then mailed his introduction from Nairobi, Kenya in January 1934.

Note, P.30, 'Writing Communities: Aesthetics, Politics, and Late Modernist Literary ...'
– Elspeth Egerton Healey, 2008 ISBN 9781243582416

== Works ==
- Passing Stranger (1936)
- The Favorite Restaurants of an American in Paris (1966)
- The Women of Montparnasse (1984) (with Hugh Ford)
