= Patrick Cudahy =

American meat packing industrialist (1849–1919)

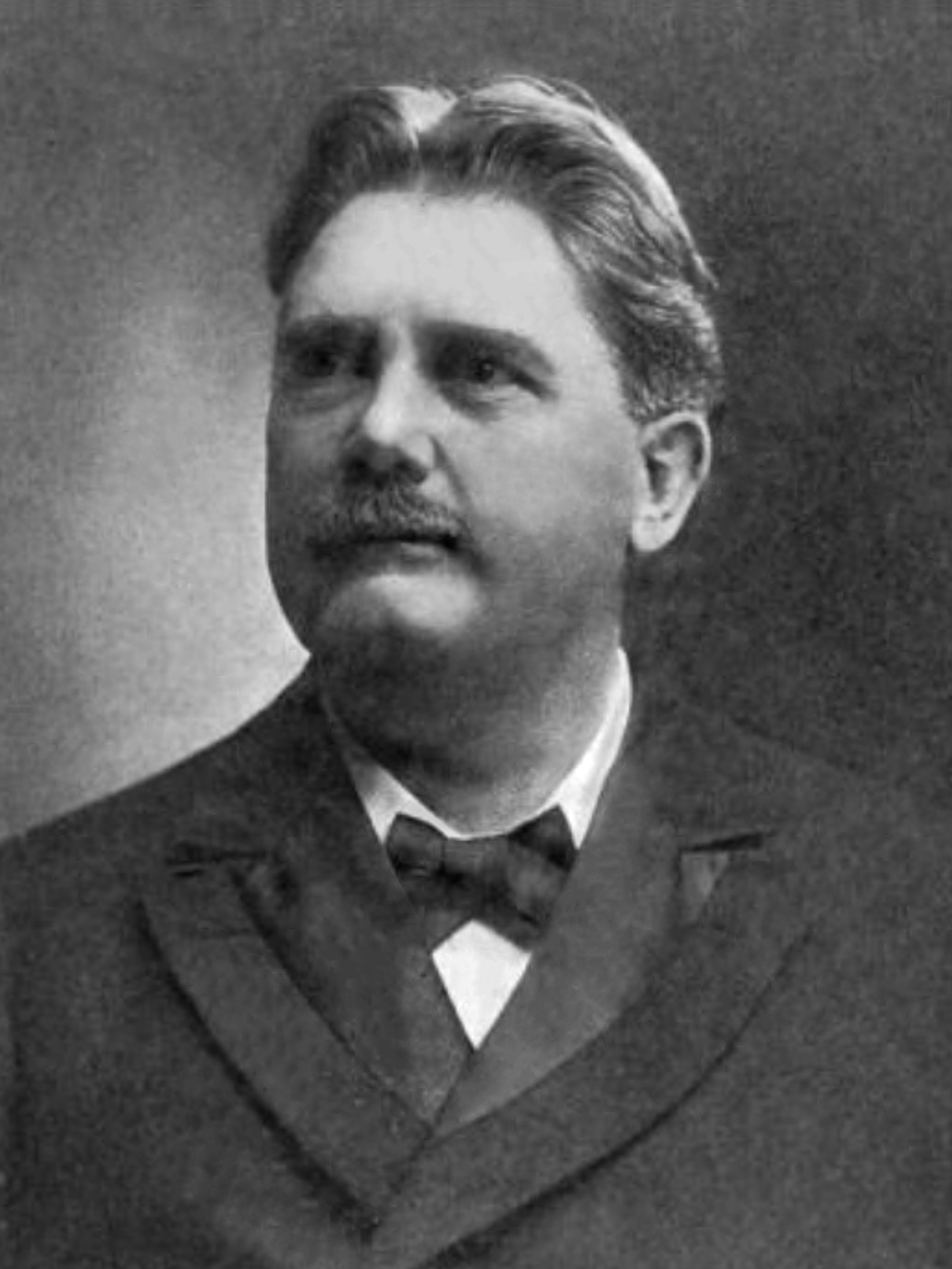
- Born: Patrick Cudahy Jr. March 17, 1849; Callan, County Kilkenny, Ireland
- Died: July 25, 1919 (aged 70); Milwaukee, Wisconsin
- Burial place: Calvary Cemetery
- Occupation: Industrialist
- Spouse: Anna Cudahy
- Children: John Cudahy; Michael Cudahy
- Parent: Patrick Cudahy Sr.
- Relatives: Michael Cudahy (brother); Edward Cudahy Sr. (brother); Edward Cudahy Jr. (nephew); Catarine Sullivan Cudahy (sister-in-law)

Signature
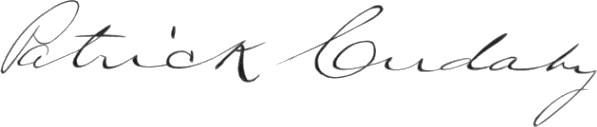

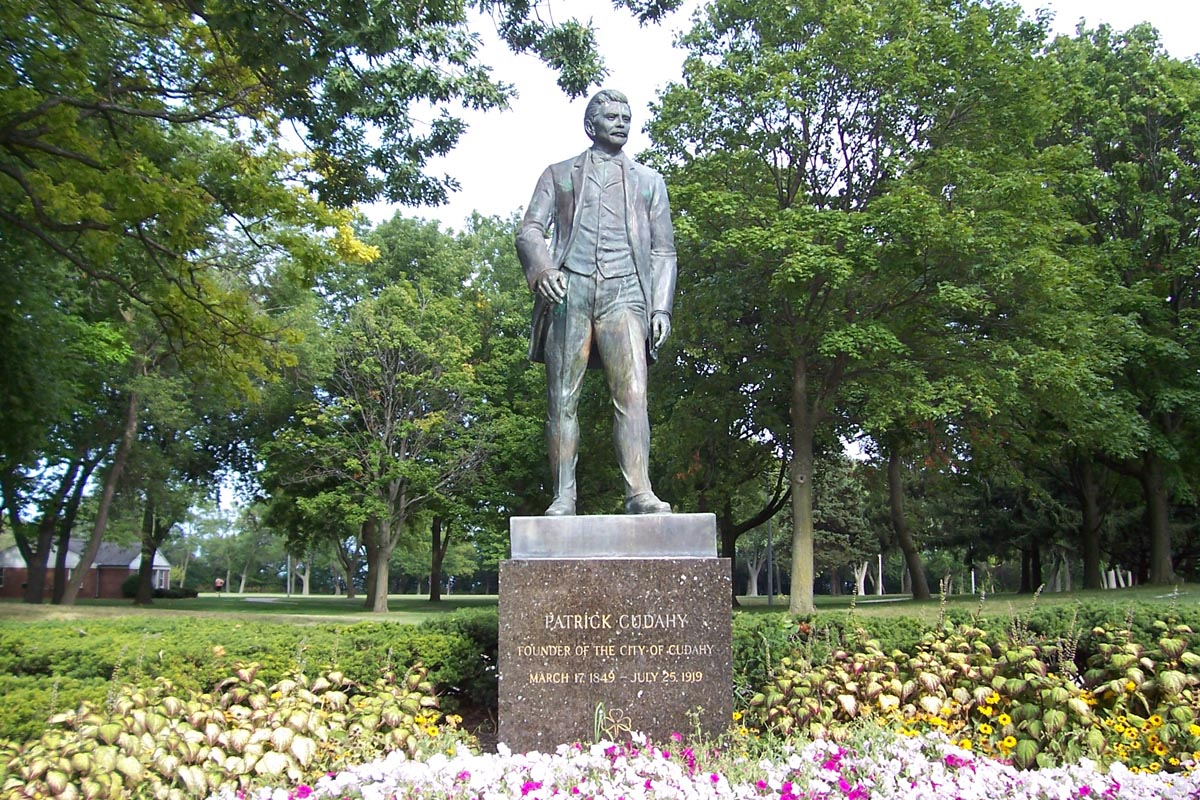
Statue in Sheridan Park

Patrick Cudahy Jr. (/ˈkʌdəheɪ/ CUD-ə-hey); March 17, 1849 – July 25, 1919) was an American industrialist in the meat packing business and a patriarch of the Cudahy family. He was also the founder and namesake of Cudahy, Wisconsin.

== Biography ==
Cudahy was born on St. Patrick's Day in Callan, County Kilkenny, Ireland. A few months after he was born, his family emigrated to Milwaukee, Wisconsin. He worked his way up at the Plankinton and Armour meat packing plant in the Menomonee Valley, becoming the superintendent in 1874. In 1888, the owner, John Plankinton, transferred the company to Patrick and his brother, John. The company became known as Cudahy Brothers.

In 1892, Cudahy moved the company to a 700-acre (2.8 km^{2}) plot of land south of Milwaukee which he and his brother John bought for the purpose. This land was in the former Town of Lake, which is now divided between the municipalities of Milwaukee, St. Francis, and Cudahy.

Cudahy "had a bittersweet relationship with the village of Cudahy" in part because he supported temperance and "fought against liquor". He "argued with the Cudahy Common Council about the spread of taverns in the village", although he also worked to assist business development and the construction of a new library. He said, "It is a source of satisfaction to me to look over those 25 years and see what has been accomplished, but I would feel much better if there were not the antagonistic spirit in Cudahy which seems to prevail to a great extent among its citizens."

Cudahy died in Milwaukee on July 25, 1919, and was interred in his family mausoleum at Calvary Cemetery.

== Family ==
Patrick Cudahy Sr., father

- Michael Cudahy (1841–1910), brother (president of Armour-Cudahy company, co-founder of the Cudahy Packing Company and the city of Cudahy, California
- John Cudahy (1843–1915), brother (silent partner of Patrick Jr. in the meat packing plants of Milwaukee, Chicago and Louisville)
- Patrick Cudahy Jr. (1849–1919)
  - Michael Francis Cudahy (1886–1970), son (president of Patrick Cudahy, Inc. from 1919 onwards)
    - Richard Dickson Cudahy (1926–2015), grandson, president of Patrick Cudahy, Inc. (1961–1971), Judge of the United States Court of Appeals for the Seventh Circuit (1979–2015)
  - John Clarence Cudahy (1887–1943), son (lawyer, real estate broker, and U.S. ambassador to Poland, Ireland and Belgium)
  - Helen Cudahy (1890/1891–1917), daughter, committed suicide by leaping from a ship into the ocean
- Edward Aloysius Cudahy Sr. (1860–1941), brother, co-founder of the Cudahy Packing Company
  - Edward Aloysius Cudahy Jr. (1884–1961), nephew
