= Cody Harris =

Cody Harris may refer to:

- Cody Harris (politician) (born 1983), American politician in Texas
- Cody Harris (darts player) (born 1985), New Zealand darts player
