= Cody Wood =

American actor and musician

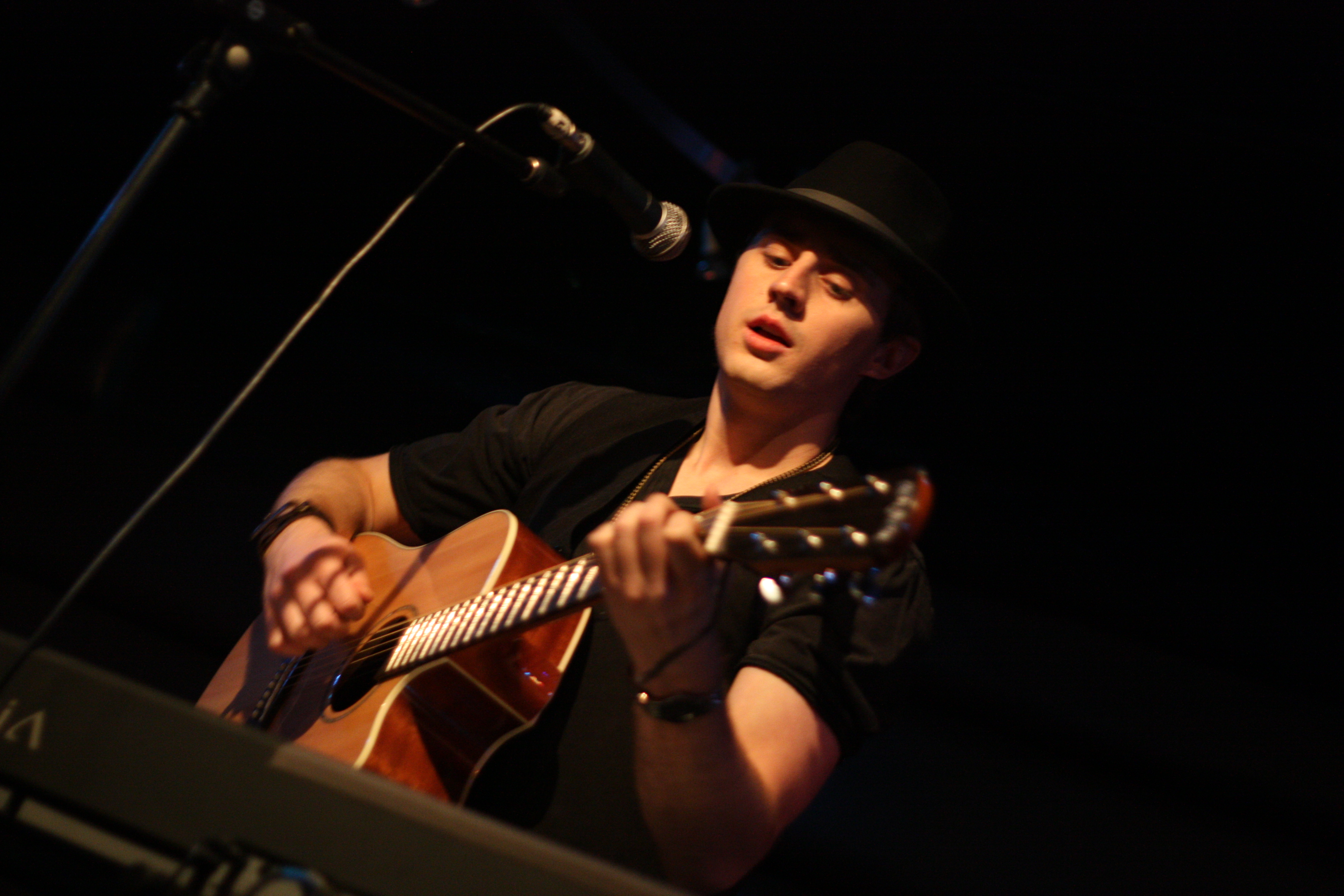
- Cody Wood Live 2011

Background information
- Birth name: Cody Brendan Wood
- Born: Santa Fe, New Mexico, U.S.
- Occupation(s): Musician, actor, writer, producer
- Instrument(s): Vocals, violin, piano, guitar
- Website: codywood.net

Cody Brendan Wood is an actor, singer, violinist, and songwriter living in Los Angeles, California.

== Personal life ==
Wood was born in Santa Fe, New Mexico, and was raised in Phoenix, Arizona, and Weston, Massachusetts. He attended college at Case Western Reserve University in Cleveland, Ohio, and completed degrees in music and biomedical engineering.

== Music videos ==
Tate Stevens "Holler if You're With Me" (violinist)

Qwiet feat. Cody Wood "To the Sky" (singer, writer)

== Studio singles ==
Cody Wood feat. Morgan Paros "Collage" (vocals, violin)

Sarah Dokowicz "With You" (writer, producer)

Qwiet feat. Cody Wood "To the Sky" (vocals, writer)

Cody Wood "How to Love" (vocals, violin)

Cora Lakey "On My Own" (writer, producer)

== Awards and nominations ==
Emerging Artist Award, Gen Art Film Festival NYC (2011)

Grammy Award for Best Choral Performance in Krzysztof Penderecki's Credo (Phoenix Boys Choir 2000)

Finalist in the John Lennon Songwriting Contest (BMI 2009)

== Studio violin ==
"I Melt With You" – feature film soundtrack

"Sudden Death" – feature film soundtrack

"Forever Found" (Kan Wakan) – studio single
