= CodY protein family =

CodY
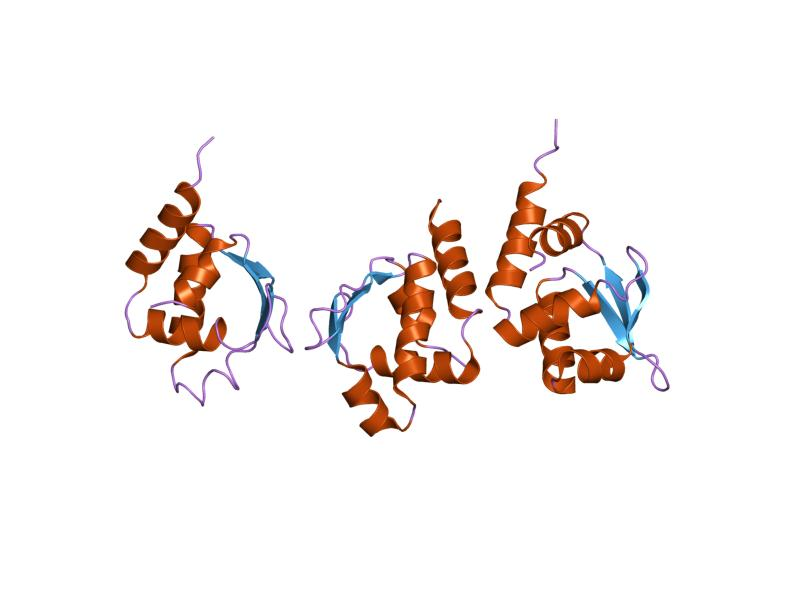
- c-terminal dna binding domain of transcriptional pleiotropic repressor cody.

Identifiers
- Symbol: CodY
- Pfam: PF06018
- Pfam clan: CL0161
- InterPro: IPR010312
Available protein structures:
- PDB: IPR010312 PF06018 (ECOD; PDBsum)
- AlphaFold: IPR010312; PF06018

In molecular biology, the CodY protein family consists of several bacterial GTP-sensing transcriptional pleiotropic repressor CodY proteins. CodY has been found to repress the dipeptide transport operon (dpp) of Bacillus subtilis in nutrient-rich conditions. The CodY protein also has a repressor effect on many genes in Lactococcus lactis during growth in milk.
