= Cody White =

Cody White may refer to:

- Cody White (offensive guard) (born 1988), American football offensive guard
- Cody White (wide receiver) (born 1998), American football wide receiver
