= Cody Anderson (disambiguation) =

Cody Anderson may refer to:

- Cody Anderson (born 1990), MLB pitcher
- Cody Anderson, In Fear and Faith band member
- Cody Anderson, a character in the Total Drama series

== See also ==
- Anderson (surname)
