= Cody Lake (Minnesota) =

Lake in the state of Minnesota, United States

- Location within Minnesota
- Location: Rice County, Minnesota
- Coordinates: 44°27′45″N 93°29′48″W
- Type: lake

Cody Lake is a lake in Rice County, in the U.S. state of Minnesota.

Cody Lake was named for Patrick Cody, an early settler.

== See also ==
- List of lakes in Minnesota
