= John Cudahy =

American diplomat

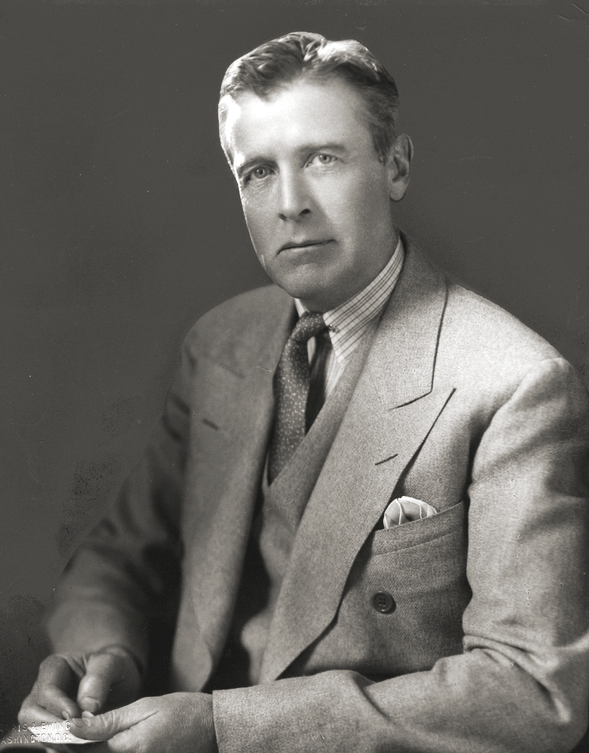

2nd United States Ambassador to Poland
- In office June 13, 1933 – April 23, 1937
- President: Franklin D. Roosevelt
- Preceded by: Ferdinand Lammot Belin
- Succeeded by: Anthony Joseph Drexel Biddle Jr.

United States Minister to the Irish Free State
- In office May 28, 1937 – January 15, 1940
- President: Franklin D. Roosevelt
- Preceded by: Alvin M. Owsley
- Succeeded by: David Gray

8th United States Ambassador to Belgium
- In office January 17, 1940 – July 18, 1940
- President: Franklin D. Roosevelt
- Preceded by: Joseph E. Davies
- Succeeded by: Anthony Joseph Drexel Biddle Jr.

United States Minister to Luxembourg
- In office January 17, 1940 – July 18, 1940
- President: Franklin D. Roosevelt
- Preceded by: Joseph E. Davies
- Succeeded by: Anthony Joseph Drexel Biddle Jr.

Personal details
- Born: December 10, 1887 Milwaukee, Wisconsin, U.S.
- Died: September 6, 1943 (aged 55) Brown Deer, Wisconsin, U.S.
- Party: Democratic
- Spouse: Katherine Reed
- Relations: Edward Cudahy Jr. (cousin)
- Children: 3, including Michael
- Parent: Patrick Cudahy
- Education: Harvard University; University of Wisconsin Law School

John Clarence Cudahy (/ˈkʌdəheɪ/ CUD-ə-hey); December 10, 1887 – September 6, 1943) was an American real estate developer and diplomat. In the years leading up to World War II, Cudahy served as United States ambassador to Poland and Belgium, and as United States minister to Luxembourg and the Irish Free State.

== Early life ==
Cudahy was born in Milwaukee, Wisconsin, the son of Anna (Madden) and Patrick Cudahy, a meat packing industrialist. He graduated from Harvard University in 1910 and from the University of Wisconsin Law School in 1913.

Cudahy served during World War I as a lieutenant in Company B of the U.S. Army's 339th Infantry Regiment. This regiment was part of the Polar Bear Expedition, which was sent to north Russia to intervene on behalf of the anti-communist forces in the Russian Civil War. On November 14, 1918, Cudahy led a counter-attack that succeeded in breaking through and routing the 1,000 Bolshevik troops that on November 11 (Armistice Day) had encircled and attacked the 600 American, Canadian, and Royal Scots soldiers who were holding the village of Tulgas on the Northern Dvina. However, his eventual disillusionment with the campaign in north Russia led him to write (under a pseudonym) the book Archangel: The American War with Russia.

Back in the United States, Cudahy headed his family's real estate company, building the Cudahy Tower Apartments on the shore of Lake Michigan in Milwaukee.

== Diplomatic service ==
Between 1933 and 1940, Cudahy served the United States as minister to several European nations.

From September 6, 1933, until April 23, 1937, Cudahy served as the American ambassador to Poland. His time in Poland was marked by a militarily backed government under Józef Piłsudski and continued tensions between Poland and Nazi Germany under Adolf Hitler.

From August 23, 1937, Cudahy served as minister to the Irish Free State, which became the Republic of Ireland in December 1937. His official title was Envoy Extraordinary and Minister Plenipotentiary, and he served until January 15, 1940.

In January 1940, Cudahy became both the ambassador to Belgium and the minister to Luxembourg. He was forced to leave these posts after Germany occupied Luxembourg and Belgium in May 1940, and the nations set up governments-in-exile. A close friend of King Leopold III, he publicly denounced Britain, France and the U.S. for a failure to plan an adequate defense. He became an embarrassment to Washington, which was officially neutral.

In 1941, Life magazine commissioned Cudahy to interview Hitler, which he did at Berghof. Cudahy later authored the book The Armies March, recounting his experiences in Europe leading up to the war, including the Battle of Belgium and his meeting with Hitler.

== Death and descendants ==
Cudahy died in September 1943, when he was thrown from a horse on his Brown Deer estate north of Milwaukee. Cudahy's son, Michael Cudahy, founded Marquette Electronics and became a major philanthropist in the city of Milwaukee. Cudahy's daughter, Mary Keogh-Stringer (born Mary Toulgas Cudahy), was a successful artist; the dedication of The Armies March reads;

for Toulgas Cudahy
whose name was taken from the battle twenty-three years ago on Armistice Day in the American war with Russia,
in the hope that her generation may see an enduring armistice.

== Works ==
- A. Chronicler (Cudahy, John) (1924). Archangel: The American War with Russia. Chicago: A. C. McClurg. ASIN B000HCN2XS.
- Cudahy, John (1928). Mañanaland: Adventuring with Camera and Rifle through California in Mexico. New York City: Duffield & Co. ASIN B000JBZYXS.
- Cudahy, John (1930). African Horizons. New York City: Duffield & Co. ASIN B00085ORWO.
- Cudahy, John (November 25, 1940). "Belgium's Léopold: U.S. Ambassador Clears the King of "Treason" Charge". Life. Vol. 9, no. 22. pp. 75–83 – via Google Books.
- Cudahy, John (1940). The Case for the King of the Belgians. New York City: privately published. ASIN B0096U441Q.
- Cudahy, John (1941). The Armies March: A Personal Report. New York City: Scribner's. ASIN B0006D8WOW.

Diplomatic posts
Preceded by Ferdinand Lammot "Mot" Belin	United States Ambassador to Poland; 1933–1937	Succeeded by Anthony Joseph Drexel Biddle Jr.
Preceded by Alvin M. Owsley	United States Envoy to the Irish Free State; 1937–1940	Succeeded by David Gray
Preceded by Joseph E. Davies	United States Ambassador to Belgium; 1940	Succeeded by Anthony Joseph Drexel Biddle Jr.
