= Martin L. Cody =

American ecologist (born 1941)

Martin Leonard Cody (born 1941) is an ecologist and former professor at the University of California, Los Angeles (UCLA). Cody graduated from the University of Pennsylvania in 1966 with a Doctor of Philosophy degree in zoology, (Note: His thesis, Spatial and Associated Patterns in Grassland Bird Communities (OCLC 80896445), was advised by Robert Helmer MacArthur.) and joined the UCLA Department of Ecology and Evolutionary Biology the same year. He was awarded a Guggenheim Fellowship in 1978. Cody retired from UCLA in 2010 and is now an emeritus professor.

== Books ==
- Cody, Martin L. (1974). Competition and the Structure of Bird Communities. Monographs in Population Biology. Vol. 7. Princeton University Press. doi:10.2307/j.ctvx5wbw7. ISBN 978-0-691-08135-9.
- Cody, Martin L.; Diamond, Jared M., eds. (1975). Ecology and Evolution of Communities. Belknap Press. ISBN 978-0-674-22444-5.
- Case, Ted J.; Cody, Martin L., eds. (1983). Island Biogeography in the Sea of Cortéz. University of California Press. ISBN 978-0-520-04799-0.
- Cody, Martin L., ed. (1985). Habitat Selection in Birds. Academic Press. ISBN 978-0-12-178080-7.
- Cody, Martin L.; Smallwood, Jeffrey A., eds. (1996). Long-Term Studies of Vertebrate Communities. Academic Press. doi:10.1016/B978-0-12-178075-3.X5000-4. ISBN 978-0-12-178075-3.
- Case, Ted J.; Cody, Martin L.; Ezcurra, Exequiel, eds. (2002). A New Island Biogeography of the Sea of Cortés (Second ed.). Oxford University Press. doi:10.1093/oso/9780195133462.001.0001. ISBN 978-0-19-513346-2.
