= Harry Cody (speed skater) =

Canadian speed skater

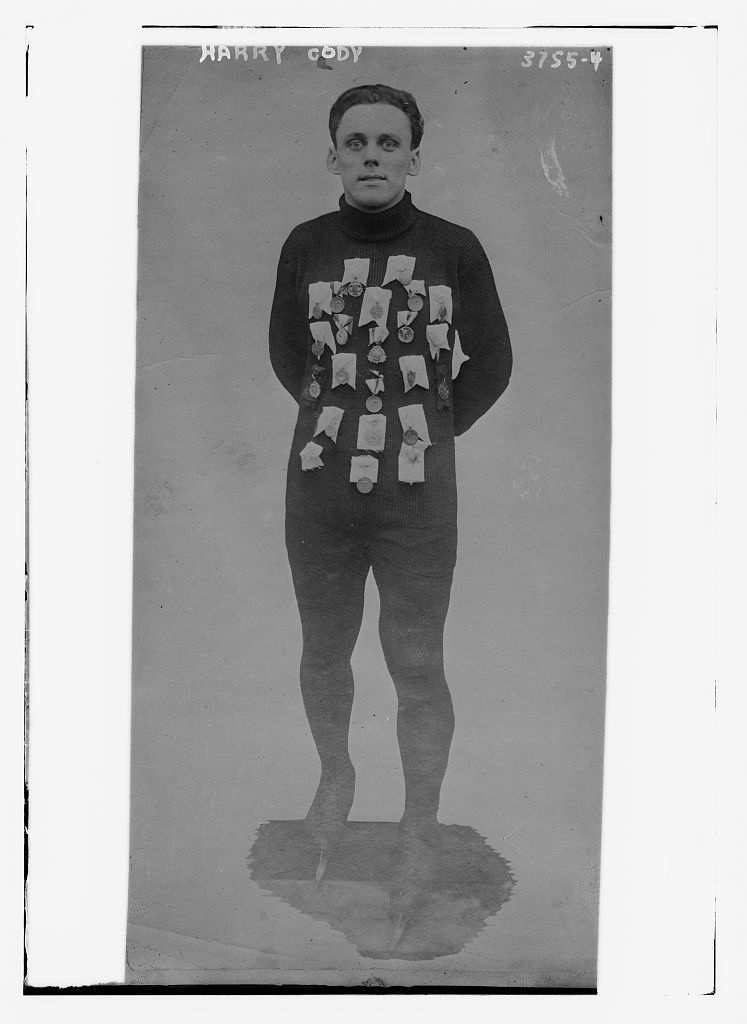
Harry Cody circa 1915

Harry Cody was the international outdoor amateur speed skating champion in 1914, 1915, and 1916.

== Biography ==
Harry Cody was born in Toronto.

On January 29, 1914 he won the three-mile championship at Saranac Lake, New York beating Bobbie Mclean who dropped out during the race

On February 10, 1916 he won the one-mile championship at Saranac Lake, New York. On February 1, 1917 he came fourth in the one-mile race, losing to Sigurd Larsen of Chicago; fourth in the three-quarter-mile race, also to Sigurd Larsen; and second in the two-mile race, losing to Arthur Staff of Chicago.

== Legacy ==
In 1983 he was inducted into the Speed Skating Canada Hall of Fame.
