= Michael Cudahy (electronics) =

American businessman and philanthropist (1924–2022)

Michael John Cudahy
- Born: March 17, 1924; Milwaukee, Wisconsin, U.S.
- Died: March 11, 2022 (aged 97); U.S.
- Occupations: entrepreneur, business executive and philanthropist

Michael John Cudahy (/ˈkʌdəheɪ/ CUD-ə-hey); March 24, 1924 – March 11, 2022) was an American entrepreneur, business executive, and philanthropist.

== Early life, family and education ==
Born in Milwaukee, Wisconsin, in 1924, Cudahy was the son of John Cudahy, United States ambassador to Ireland, Poland and Belgium. His grandfather was Patrick Cudahy, founder of the Patrick Cudahy Meat Company.

On August 2, 2007, WTMJ-AM in Milwaukee reported that Michael Cudahy was one of several private investors considering purchasing Midwest Airlines.

== Career ==
Along with Warren Cozzens, Cudahy founded Marquette Electronics in 1965 and was chairman and CEO. The company went public in 1991. After starting with only $15,000 in capital, the company went on to have over $350 million annually in sales. This company created the nation's first central electrocardiographic system at Northwestern University Medical School. The machine became standard in hospitals throughout the United States. The company was also noted for having one of the first on-site daycare centers in the nation.

In 1982, he and Warren bought the failing Patient Monitoring Business Unit from GE (then known as General Electric Medical Systems Division) and combined it with the existing business (primarily diagnostic equipment). In 1998, however, he sold Marquette Electronics (by then known as Marquette Medical Systems) to GE for $810 million. The company exists today as part of the Clinical Systems division of GE Healthcare, a subsidiary of the American conglomerate. After stepping aside at his company, Cudahy focused his energies on philanthropy and being on the boards of other companies.

In 1999, according to U.S. Securities and Exchange Commission (SEC) filings, he invested $10 million in TomoTherapy a Madison, Wisconsin, biotechnology start-up. It went public on May 9, 2007, with the stock symbol TOMO. Mr. Cudahy's 10% interest was valued at more than $100 million by September 2007.

He told the story of the founding of Marquette Electronics in the book Joyworks (2002; ISBN 0-938076-17-5).

== Philanthropy ==
In addition to his business career, Cudahy was a prolific philanthropist, donating tens of millions of dollars to educational, cultural, and civic institutions in Milwaukee through both direct gifts and the Michael J. Cudahy Charitable Foundation. Starting in 2000, his giving supported a wide range of causes including medical centers, university buildings, and scholarship programs. Among his contributions, Cudahy funded an endowed academic position in cardiology known as the Michael J. Cudahy Professorship in Cardiology at the Johns Hopkins School of Medicine, established with a $1.5 million gift to the institution.

Cudahy’s philanthropy also included major gifts to Marquette University, where he funded the construction of Cudahy Hall, the university’s main computing facility, and gave $1 million in 2017 for full scholarships for first-generation engineering students.

== Personal life and death ==
Cudahy was working up to his 90th birthday in March 2014.

Cudahy died on March 11, 2022, at the age of 97.
