= Cudahy Packing Company =

American meat packing company (1887–1981)

Cudahy Packing Company (later Cudahy Company)
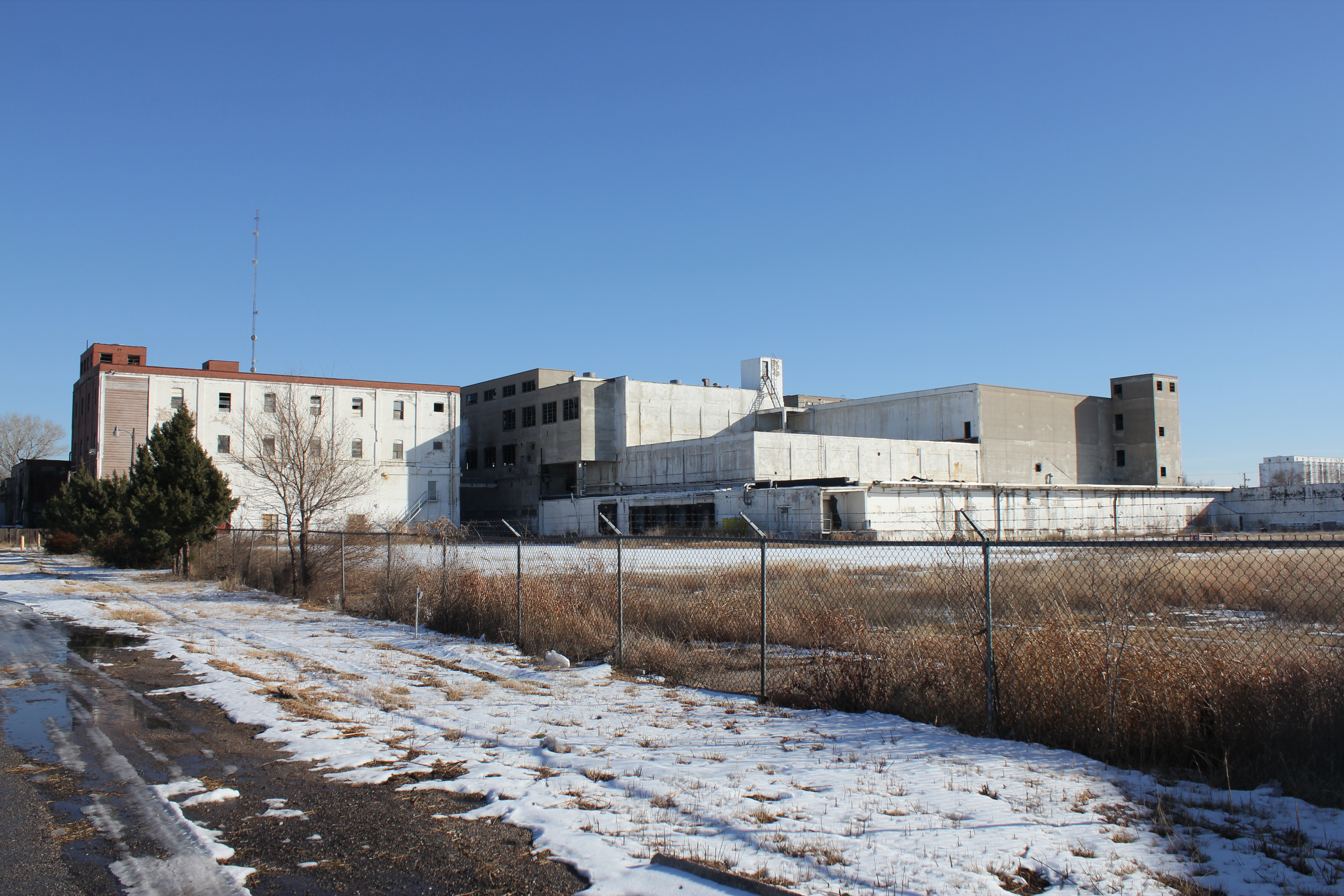
- The Cudahy Packing Plant, located at 2300 N. Broadway Street in Wichita, Kansas. The property is listed on the National Register of Historic Places.
- Industry: Meat packing
- Founded: 1887
- Founders: Michael Cudahy
- Fate: Acquired in 1981
- Successor: Bar-S Foods Company

Cudahy Packing Company (/ˈkʌdəheɪ/ CUD-ə-hey) was an American meat packing company established in 1887 as the Armour-Cudahy Packing Company and incorporated in Maine in 1915. The Cudahy meatpacking business was acquired by Bar-S Foods Company in 1981.

== History ==
In 1887, Michael Cudahy, with the backing of Philip Danforth Armour, started the Armour-Cudahy packing plant in Omaha, Nebraska.

Cudahy Packing Company was created in 1890 when Cudahy bought Armour's interest. The company added branches across the country, including a cleaning products plant at East Chicago, Indiana, built in 1909. In 1911, the company's headquarters were relocated from Omaha to Chicago.

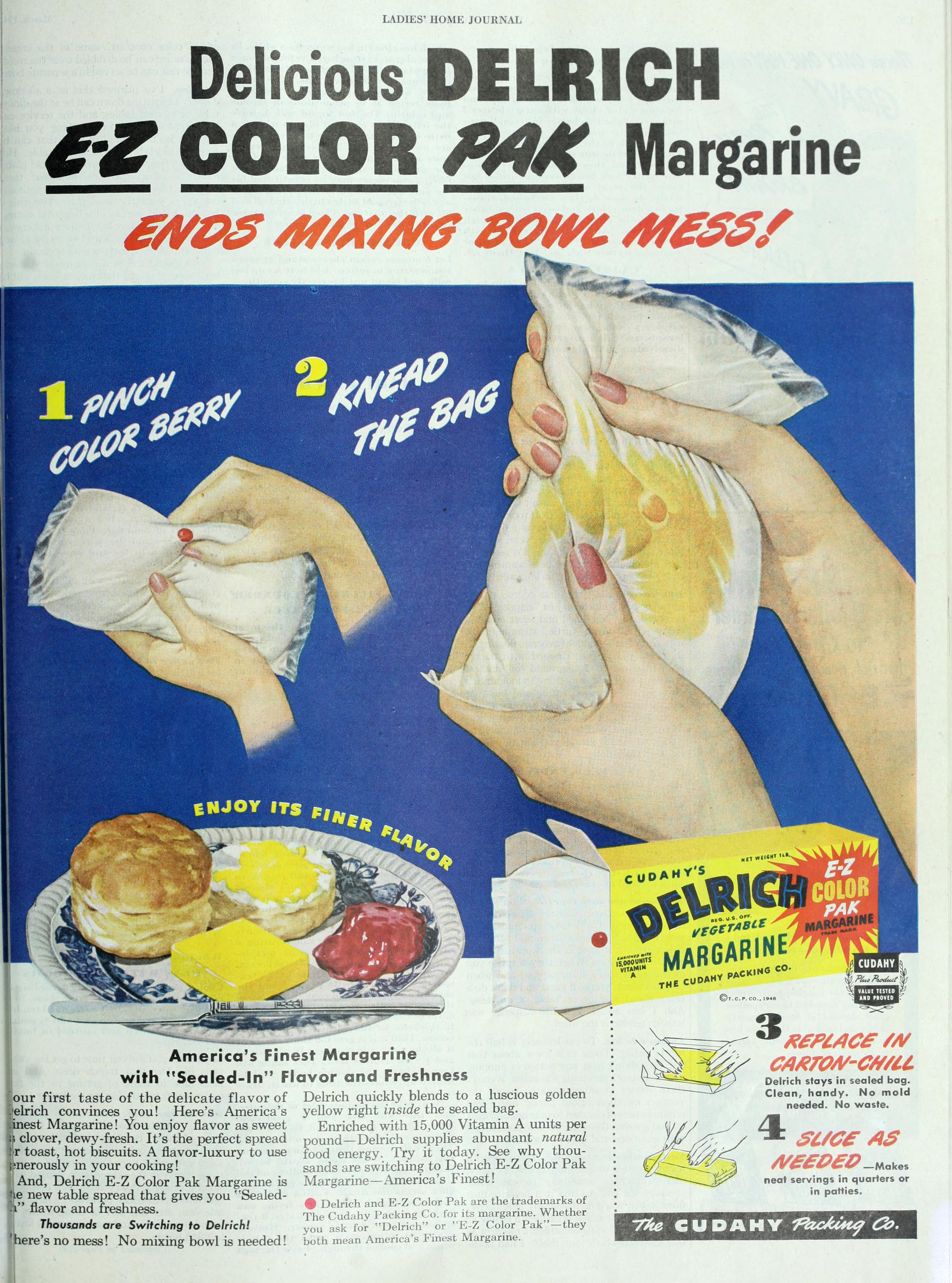
Cudahy Packing Company's Delrich brand of margarine used a "color berry" to color its white vegetable based margarine yellow. This 1948 advertisement demonstrates how to color the margarine inside the package

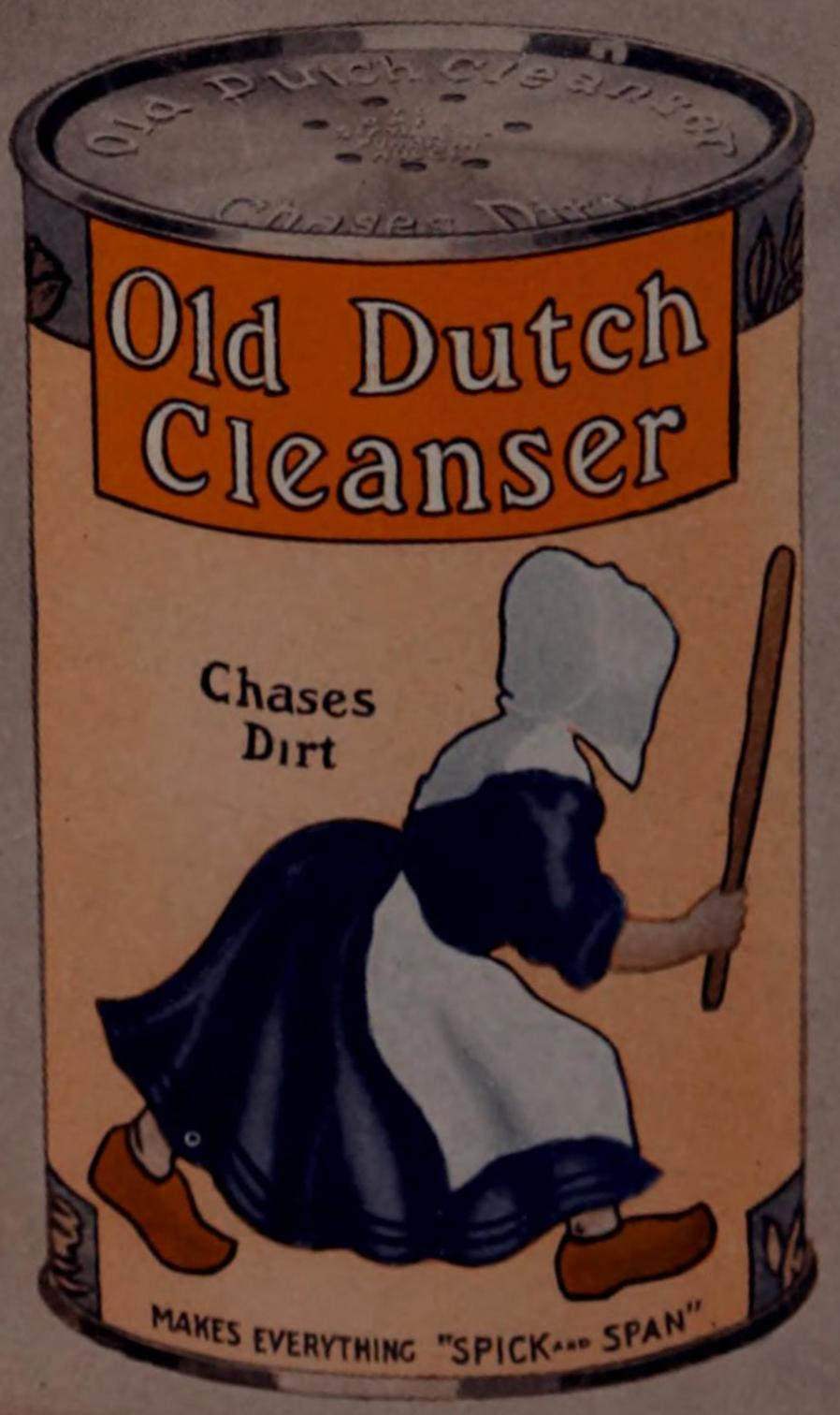
Old Dutch Cleanser container in 1913

In 1905, Cudahy Packing Company introduced Old Dutch Cleanser. In 1955, Purex acquired Old Dutch Cleanser from Cudahy. The Greyhound Corporation acquired the consumer products business of Purex (which included Old Dutch Cleanser) in 1985 and was combined with Greyhound's Armour-Dial division, forming The Dial Corporation. In December 2003, Dial was sold to Henkel for $2.9 billion.

By 1922, Cudahy Packing Company was one of the largest packing houses in the United States with over $200 million in annual sales and 13,000 employees around the country with operations in South Omaha, Kansas City, Saint Joseph, Sioux City, Wichita, Memphis, East Chicago, Salt Lake City, and Los Angeles, as well as distribution operations in 97 cities. The business suffered during the Great Depression, but the company still employed about 1,000 Chicago-area residents during the mid-1930s.

Following World War II, it moved its headquarters first to Omaha and then in 1956 to Phoenix, where it took the name Cudahy Company. In 1957, the company was one of 500 companies listed in the first S&P 500.

In 1957, Cudahy purchased the Seattle Packing Company which owned the Bar-S trademark and began selling various meat products under the Cudahy Bar-S name. In 1970, Cudahy was acquired by General Host which split the Cudahy company into separate business components. The meat processing operations became a division known as Cudahy Foods.

In 1981, General Host sold the remnants of the Cudahy meat packing business to Tim Day, president of Cudahy foods who renamed the acquisition Bar-S Foods Company. Bar-S Foods Company was acquired by the Mexican packer Sigma Alimentos in 2010, which continues to produce lunch meats, hot dogs, sausages and bacon in the U.S. under the Bar-S trademark.
