= John Bauer (illustrator) =

Swedish painter and illustrator (1882–1918)

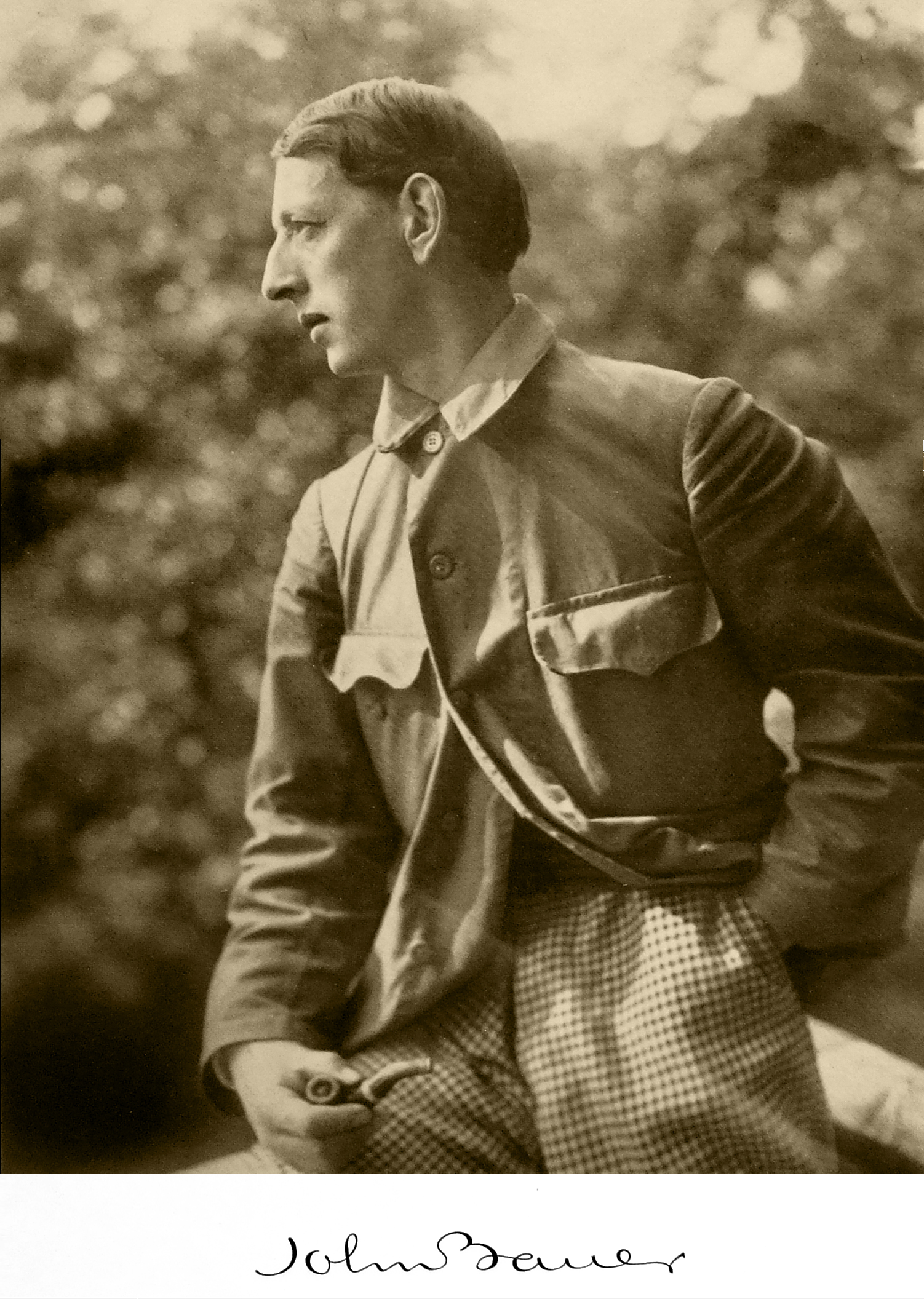
- John Bauer with his signature
- Born: John Albert Bauer; 4 June 1882; Jönköping, Sweden
- Died: 20 November 1918 (aged 36); Vättern, Sweden
- Resting place: Jönköping, Sweden
- Education: Royal Swedish Academy of Arts, Stockholm
- Known for: Illustration, painting
- Notable work: Tuvstarr gazes into the water The Fairy Princess; Saint Martin, the Holy
- Movement: Romantic nationalism
- Spouse: Ester Ellqvist (m. 1906)

John Albert Bauer (4 June 1882 – 20 November 1918) was a Swedish painter and illustrator. His work is concerned with landscape and mythology, but he also composed portraits. He is best known for his illustrations of early editions of Bland tomtar och troll (Among Gnomes and Trolls), an anthology of Swedish folklore and fairy tales.

Bauer was born and raised in Jönköping. At 16 he moved to Stockholm to study at the Royal Swedish Academy of Arts. While there he received his first commissions to illustrate stories in books and magazines, and met the artist Ester Ellqvist, whom he married in 1906. He traveled throughout Lappland, Germany and Italy early in his career, and these cultures deeply informed his work. He painted and illustrated in a romantic nationalistic style, in partly influenced by the Renaissance and Sami cultures. Most of his works are watercolors or prints in monochrome or muted colours; he also produced oil paintings and frescos. His illustrations and paintings broadened the understanding and appreciation of Swedish folklore, fairy tales and landscape.

When Bauer was 36, he drowned, together with Ester and their son Bengt, in a shipwreck on Vättern, a lake in southern Sweden.

== Biography ==
=== Early life and education ===
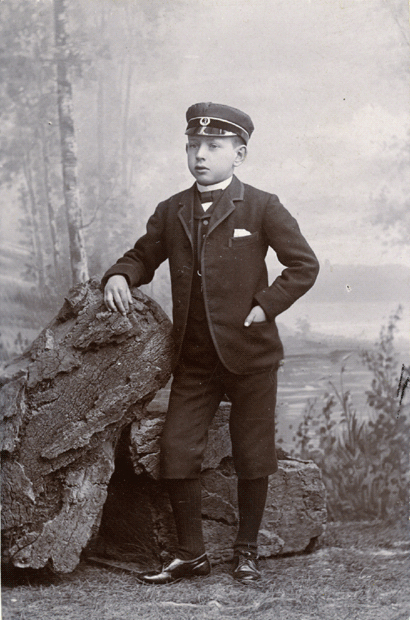
A young John Bauer

John Bauer was born on 4 June 1882 in Jönköping, the son of Josef Bauer, a man of Bavarian origin, and Emma Charlotta Wadell, from a farming family from the town Rogberga just outside Jönköping. Josef Bauer came to Sweden in 1863, penniless. He founded a successful charcuterie business at the Östra Torget in Jönköping. The family lived in the apartment above the shop until 1881 when the construction of their house in Sjövik was completed. John, born in 1882, lived at the Villa Sjövik by the shore of Lake Rocksjön with his parents and two brothers, one older and one younger; his only sister died at a young age. The family home would remain central to him long after he lived on his own. His initial schooling was at the Jönköpings Högre Allmäna Läroverk (The Jönköping Public School of Higher Education), followed by the Jönköpings Tekniska Skola (The Jönköping Technical School) from 1892 to 1898. He spent most of his time drawing caricatures of his teachers and daydreaming, something not appreciated by his teachers.

He was given to sketching and drawing from an early age, without encouragement from his family. However, when he turned sixteen and wanted to go to Stockholm to study art, they were enthusiastic for him and backed him financially. In 1898, he was one of the 40 applicants to study at the Royal Swedish Academy of Arts, and although he was deemed well qualified for a place at the academy, he was too young to be accepted. He spent the next two years at the Kaleb Ahltins school for painters. During this time he was, like many teenagers, torn between hope and despair, something that is reflected in his artwork.

By 1900, Baeur was old enough to attend the Academy of Arts. Baeur was one of the three students admitted that year; the two other successful applicants were his friends Ivar Kamke and Pontus Lanner. He studied traditional illustrations and made drawings of plants, medieval costumes and croquis; all of which served him in his later work. One of his teachers, professor and noted historic painter, Gustaf Cederström praised Bauer:

His art is what I would call great art, in his almost miniaturized works he gives an impression of something much more powerful than many monumental artists can accomplice on acres of canvas. It is not size that matters but content.

While at the academy, he received his first commissions to illustrate magazines (including the Söndags-Nisse and Snöflingan) and books (e.g. De gyllene böckerna, Ljungars saga and Länge, länge sedan). In 1904 he traveled to Lappland to create paintings for a book on the culture of the county and its "exotic wilderness". At the end of 1905, he left the academy and put "Artist" on his business card.

=== Journey to Lappland ===
Following the discovery of iron ore deposits in the north of Sweden, Lappland became a frontier for industrial development, instead of an exotic wilderness of the Sami culture and midnight sun. Opportunistically, Carl Adam Victor Lundholm published his Lappland, det stora svenska framtidslandet (Lappland, the great Swedish land of the future). He engaged noted Swedish artists—such as Karl Tirén, Alfred Thörne, Per Daniel Holm and Hjalmar Lindberg—to create the illustrations. Since Bauer was an inexperienced illustrator by comparison, Lundholm tested his abilities by sending him to create some drawings of Sami people at Skansen.

Although reluctant to audition for the commission, on 15 July 1904 Bauer left for Lappland and stayed there for a month. Coming from the dense, dark forests of Småland he was overwhelmed by the open vistas and colorful landscapes. His encounters with the Sami people and their culture became important for his later works. He took many photos, sketched and made notes of the tools, costumes and objects he saw, but he had difficulty becoming close to the Sami, due to their shyness. He recorded his experiences in his diary and in letters to his family and friends. After a visit to a Sami goahti he noted: "All light from above. If the head is tilted forward it is dark. The lit parts of the figure always lighter than the tent canvas. Sharp shadows run like spokes from the middle of the goathi."

The book on Lappland was published in 1908, with eleven watercolors by Bauer. They were painted in Stockholm, almost 18 months after his visit, using the photos and sketches he had collected during his journey. Many of the photos resulted in other drawings and paintings. Most of these were romanticized versions of the photos, but he succeeded in capturing the nuances and ambiance of the goahtis, and the richness of the Sami garments and crafts. Details from the Sami culture, such as the bent knives, shoes, spears, pots and belts, became important elements in the clothes and ornamentations of Bauer's trolls. Bauer's eye for detail and his numerous notes also made the material an ethnographic documentation of the era.

=== Courtship and marriage ===
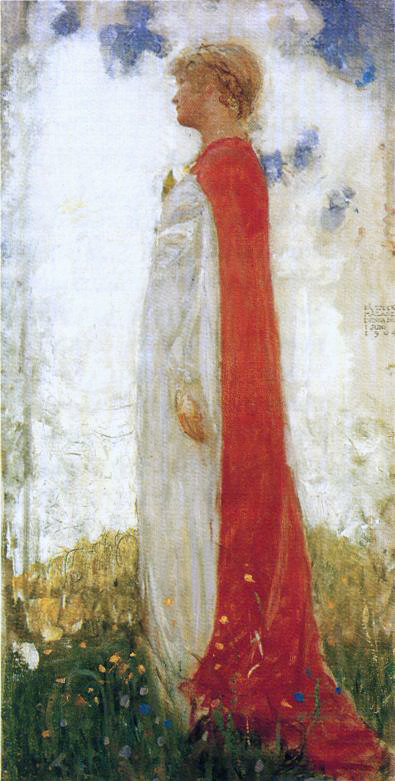
The Fairy Princess, 1904, oil sketch

Bauer met fellow student Ester Ellqvist at the Royal Swedish Academy of Arts. Ellqvist studied at the separate department for women, since women were not allowed to attend the same classes as the men and their education was conducted in a different manner. (Note: e.g. When they did croquis, the models were not allowed to remove all of their clothing.) So, while Ellqvist was talented and ambitious, she did not have an equal opportunity as her male colleagues to develop her artistry, and society's expectation was that her role in life would be that of housewife, not an artist.

Bauer started courting her in 1903, but since they were apart most of the time, this was done by mail. Their relationship developed as they shared their dreams, aspirations, doubts and insecurities in their correspondence. (Note: Most of the correspondence attributed to John Bauer (about 1000 letters) is now in the Jönköpings läns museum. The letters in the collection are in the process of being digitized. Other letters to and from Bauer can be found at the National Library of Sweden and the Gothenburg University Library) For Bauer, Ellqvist became his inspiration, muse, and "fairy princess"; it was as such he painted her for the first time in Sagoprinsessan (The Fairy Princess). He made sketches for the painting in 1904, and finalized them in an oil painting in 1905. Ellqvist is portrayed as a strong, enlightened and unobtainable Valkyrie. The painting was shown at Bauer's first exhibition at the Valand Academy in Gothenburg in 1905 (where he was one of eleven debutants) and in Norrköping in 1906, where it was sold to a private collector. It is now in the Jönköpings läns museum. Bauer tried to mold Ellqvist into his vision of a creature of the woods and as the perfect artist's wife; he wanted her to make a home for them in a romantic cottage in the woods, while he wandered about the forest seeking inspiration.

Ellqvist, on the other hand, had been raised in Stockholm and was a lively person who enjoyed the social life that could only be found in towns or cities. She wanted to settle down in a comfortable place with a husband and have children. Bauer was not sufficiently established an artist to provide for a family; throughout his entire lifetime he relied on his parents for financial support. When he proposed to Ellqvist, Bauer did so without the approval of his parents, who thought that he should be more established in a career and self-supporting before marriage.

On 18 December 1906, Bauer and Ellqvist were married. Little is known of their first years together since they now lived in the same house, making letters unnecessary. Bauer had jobs illustrating covers for magazines, like Hvar 8 Dag, and began work on Bland tomtar och troll (Among Gnomes and Trolls). In 1908, John and Ester traveled to Italy together; on their return they found a house, the "Villa Björkudden", situated on the shores of Lake Bunn just outside Gränna. They bought the house in 1914, and the following year their son Bengt (called "Putte") was born. The birth of Putte marked a harmonious and joyful time for the couple. Bauer made his final illustrations for Among Gnomes and Trolls, his grand farewell to the series, which freed him to explore playwriting and make frescos. He showed his paintings at exhibitions and experimented with modernism, (Note: This experimentation can be seen in the gouache Fanstyg (Devilry), where he mocked figures from his earlier paintings in distorted blue shapes and Blå Eva (Blue Eve), a dreamlike tempera of Eve in blue shades painted in 1918.) but all this came at a cost. Bauer was often away, leaving Ellqvist alone at home, and he no longer had the steady income that the illustrations had provided. By 1917, their marriage was in trouble, and in 1918, Bauer put his thoughts about a divorce in a letter to his wife.

Over time, Bauer used Ellqvist as a model less frequently. With the birth of their son, Bauer started to paint pictures with children as part of the composition. The painting Rottrollen (The Root Trolls), completed in 1917, is of Putte sleeping among troll-shaped roots in a forest.

=== Journey to Italy ===
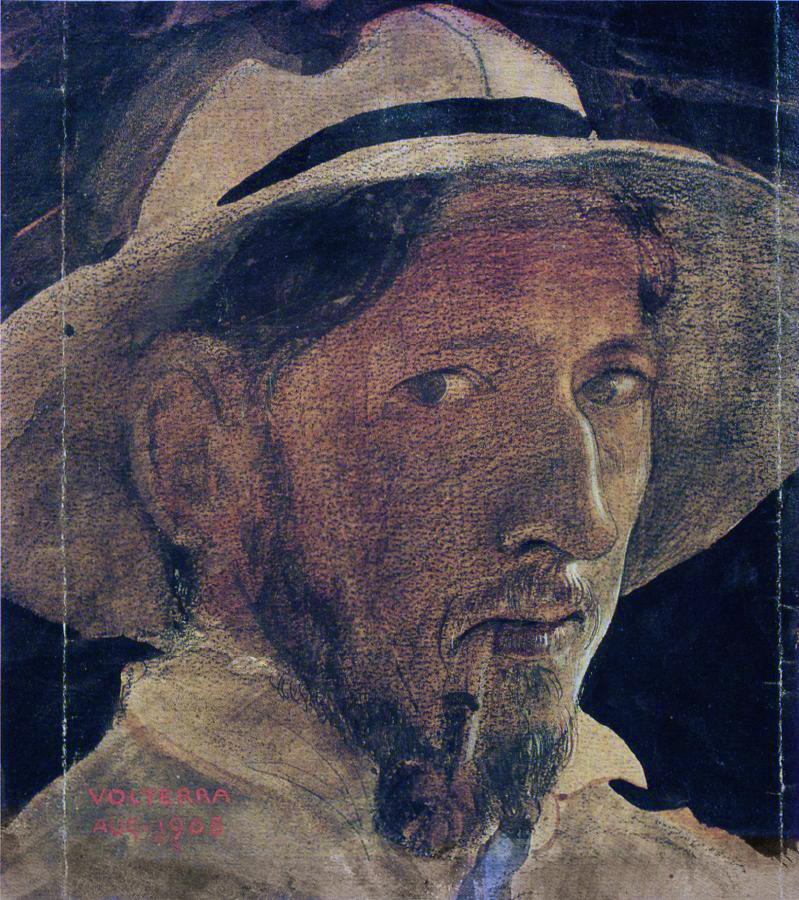
Self-portrait, 1908, oil on canvas

Bauer and his wife made a long journey to Italy at Josef's expense in 1909. They chose to travel through Germany and on to Italy based on his readings of medieval towns during a 1902 visit to Germany with his father. The couple visited Verona, Florence, Siena and spent two months in Volterra. They continued through Naples and Capri, spending the winter in Rome.

Throughout their travels they studied art and visited churches and museums, which appealed to Bauer's eclectic mind. In the evenings they went to small tavernas to enjoy the ambiance; all of which is recorded in the letters they sent home to Bauer's family. Bauer's sketchbooks are full of studies of antique objects and Renaissance art, some of which he used for his illustrations. A portrait of Ghirlandaio by Sandro Botticelli is said to be the basis for Svanhamnen (The Swan maiden), and Piero della Francesca's work was the inspiration for Den helige Martin (Saint Martin, the Holy). He also became intrigued by frescoes. He was exuberant in the study of art, but he also became homesick for the quiet serenity of the Swedish forest which resulted in some of his best winter pictures with white snow, dark woods and the sky glittering with tiny stars.

Their journey was abandoned after a murder in their building in Rome. Bauer was interrogated by Italian police due to a misunderstanding. He was never a suspect but the situation became public, leaving a bitter memory of their visit to Rome.

=== Death on Lake Vättern ===
Bauer, Ester and their three-year-old son, Bengt, were on their way to their new home in Stockholm, where Bauer hoped for spiritual renewal and a new life for himself and his family. A recent, well-publicized train accident at Getå caused Bauer to book their return to Stockholm by boat, the steamer Per Brahe.

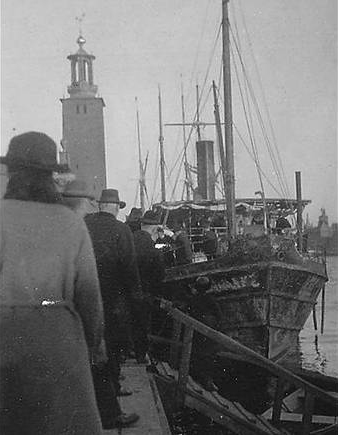
The SS Per Brahe in Stockholm after the salvage

On the night of 19 November 1918, when the steamer left Gränna it was loaded with iron stoves, plowshares, sewing machines and barrels of produce. All the cargo did not fit into the hold and a significant portion was stored unsecured on deck, making the ship top-heavy. The weather was bad and by the time the steamer was at sea a full storm was raging; the wind caused the cargo on deck to shift, some of it falling overboard, further destabilizing the ship. The ship capsized and went down, stern first, just 500 metres (1,600 feet) from the next port, Hästholmen, killing all 24 people on board, including the Bauers. Most of the passengers had been trapped in their cabins.

The wreckage was found on 22 November 1918 at a depth of 32 metres (105 feet), and was salvaged on 12 August 1922. Investigations indicated that just one third of the cargo had been stowed in the hold, the rest unsecured on deck. The salvage operation turned into a bizarre public attraction; for example, a sewing machine from the steamer was smashed into pieces and sold for one crown each. It is estimated that about 20,000 people came to watch the raising of the ship, requiring the addition of trains from Norrköping. Newsreels featuring the raising of the ship were shown in cinemas all over Sweden. In order to finance the salvage operation, the Per Brahe was sent on a macabre tour throughout Sweden. The newspapers fed people's superstitions that the mythical creatures of the forests had claimed Bauer by sinking the ship. The most common theme was connected to the tale Agneta och sjökungen (Agneta and the Sea King) from 1910 in which the Sea King lures a maiden into the depths. On 18 August 1922, the Bauers were buried at the Östra cemetery in Jönköping (in quarter 04 plot number 06).

== Career ==
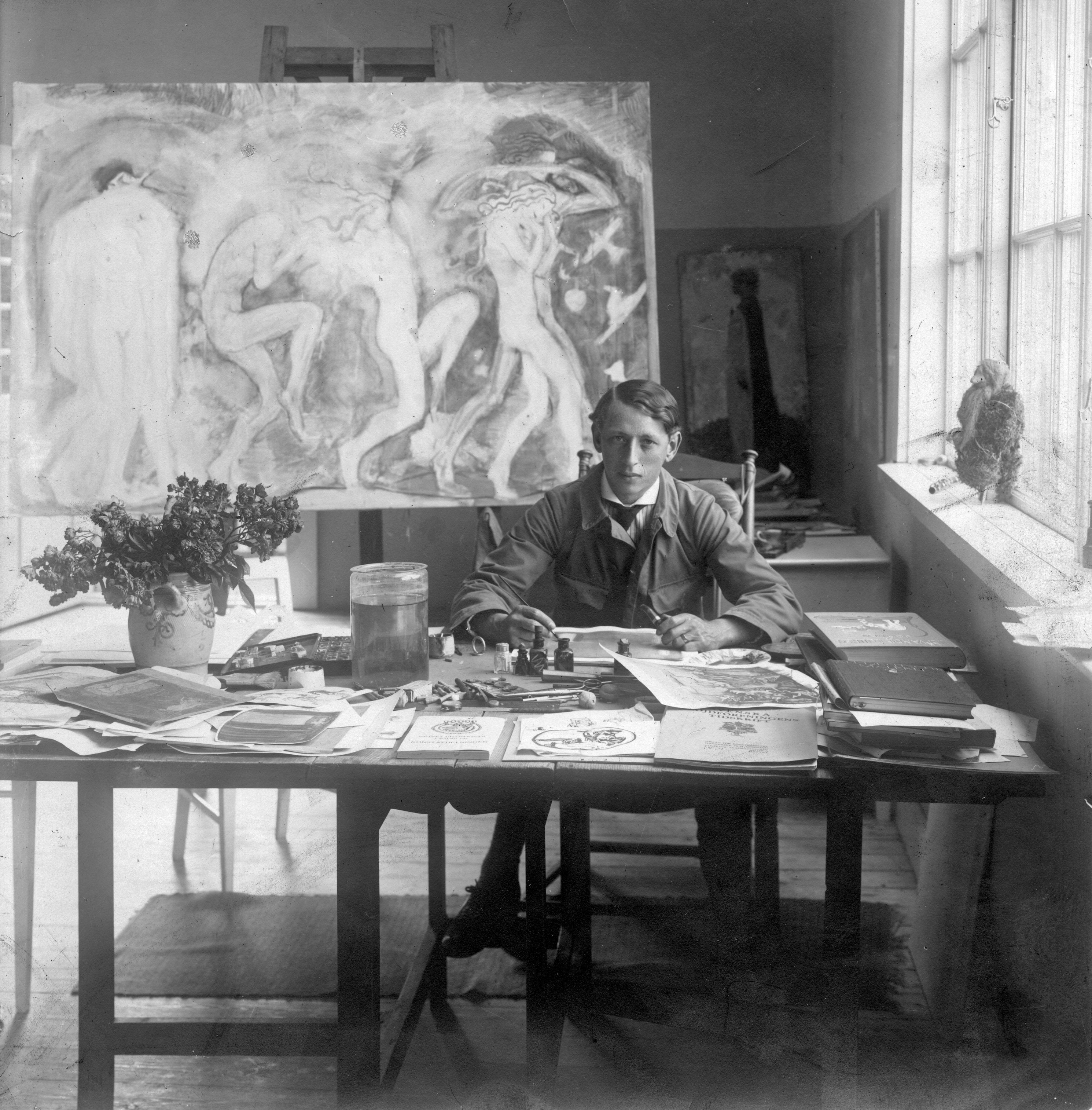
Bauer at his working desk

=== Subjects ===
Bauer's favorite subject was Swedish nature, the dense forests where the light trickled down through the tree canopies. Ever since he was little he had wandered in the dark woods of Småland imagining all the creatures living there. His paintings frequently included detailed depictions of plants, mosses, lichens and mushrooms found in the Swedish woods. He is best known for his illustrations of Among Gnomes and Trolls.

In a 1953 article in Allers Familje-journal (Allers Family Journal), his friend Ove Eklund stated that "although [Bauer] only mumbled about and never said clearly", he believed that all the creatures he drew actually existed. Eklund had on several occasions accompanied Bauer on his walks through the forests by Lake Vättern, and Bauer's description of all the things he thought existed made Eklund feel he could see them as well.

Ove Eklund on Bauer:

Yes, there he was, John Bauer, with his brown, eternal pipe glued to the corner of his mouth. Now and then he blew a small cloud of brown troll smoke straight up into the turquoise-bleu, sun-sparkling space. And muttered something far behind his tight, narrow lips—not always so easy to decipher. But I, having had the key for many years, understood most of it.

=== Inspiration ===
Bauer and his friends were part of a generation of Swedish painters who started their careers just before the Modernism movement began to flourish, but at the same time were considerably younger than those dominating the Swedish art scene: artists such as Carl Larsson, Anders Zorn and Bruno Liljefors. Bauer was inspired by these artists, but from his heritage came in contact with Fritz Erler, Max Klinger and other German illustrators. He lived in an era when the Old Norse were romanticized throughout Scandinavia, and borrowed ideas and motifs from artists like Theodor Kittelsen and Erik Werenskiöld, yet his finished works were in his own style. After his journey to Italy his works clearly showed elements from the 14th century Renaissance. The pictures of princes and princesses had elements from Flemish tapestries, and even the trolls garments were pleated, much like the draped clothing seen in antique Roman sculptures.

=== Style ===
Bauer had a time-consuming technique when painting: he would start with a small sketch, no bigger than a stamp, with just the basic shapes. Then he would make another, slightly bigger, sketch with more details. The sketches grew progressively in size and detail until the work reached its final size. Most of the originals for About Gnomes and Trolls are square pictures about 20 to 25 centimetres (7.9 to 9.8 inches). He doodled on anything at hand, from used stationery to the back of an envelope. Many of his sketches resemble cartoon strips where the pictures get bigger and more detailed. He would also do several versions of the same finished picture, such as one where the motif is depicted in a summer and winter scene. He did not observe the traditional hierarchy in the mediums or techniques at that time. He could make a complete work in pencil or charcoal just as well as a sketch in oil.

From an early age Bauer had to adapt his illustrations to contemporary printing technique. Full-colour was expensive, so the illustrations were made in one colour plus black. As the process developed and his works became in greater demand, his pictures were eventually printed in full colour.

=== Watercolor ===
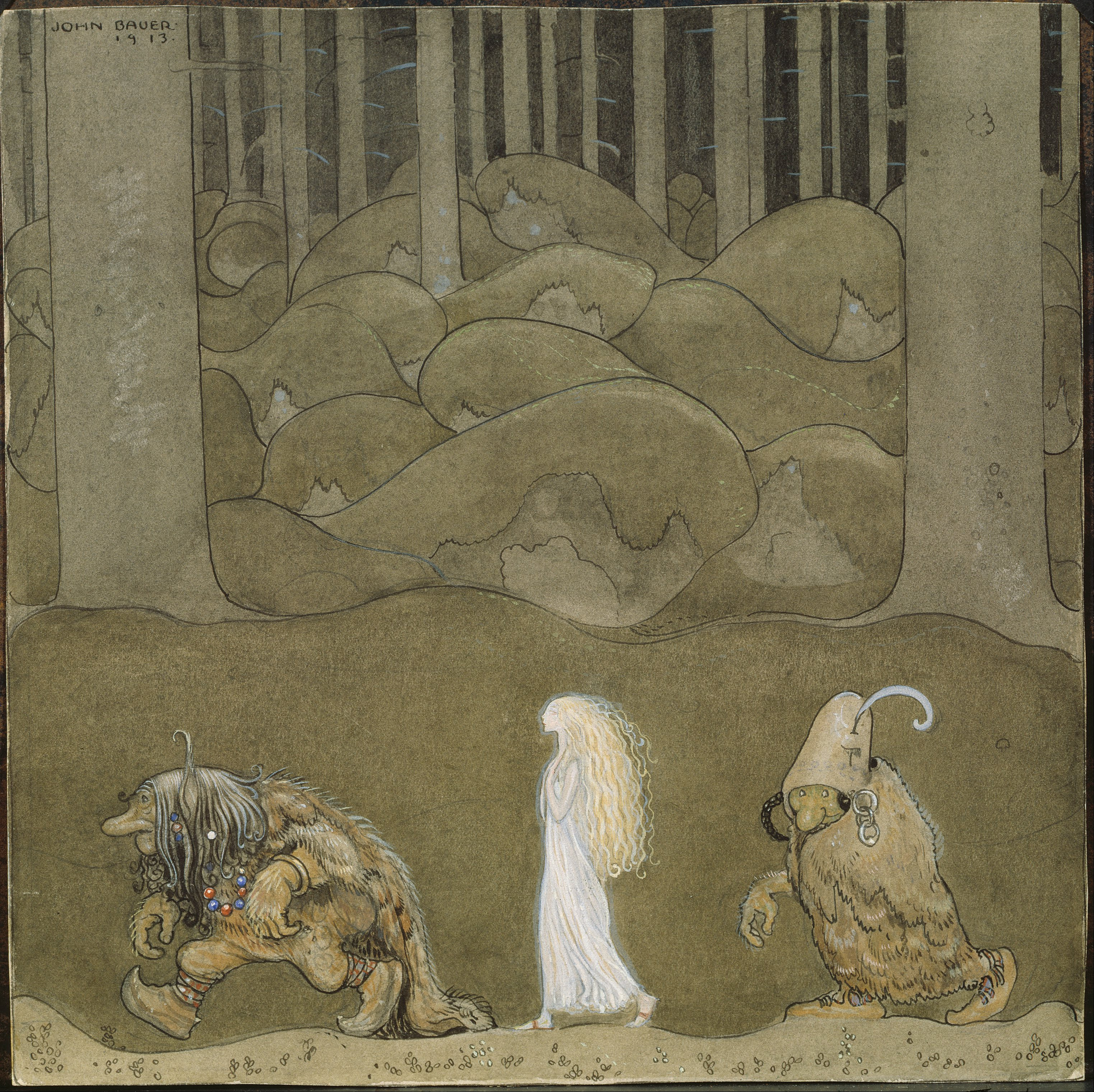
One evening around midsummer, they went with Bianca Maria deep into the forest, 1913, watercolor

The most noted of Bauer's pictures are his watercolors, the technique he used when illustrating for books and magazines; he alternated between aquarelle and gouache. When he created illustrations the two mediums were sometimes mixed, since he needed both the speed of the aquarelle and the contrast and impasto that the gouache provided. These water-soluble, and fast drying, media allowed Bauer to work on his pictures until the last minute before deadline, something he was prone to do.

=== Among Gnomes and Trolls ===
In 1907, Bauer was asked by the Åhlén & Åkerlund publishing house (now Bonnier Group) to illustrate their new series of books, Among Gnomes and Trolls. The books would be published annually, and contain stories by prominent Swedish authors. The majority of Bauer's pictures for the book were full-page watercolor illustrations in a muted color scheme; he also contributed with covers, vignettes and other smaller illustrations. Bauer's most significant creatures, the trolls, were rendered in shades of gray, green, and brown, the colors of the forests, as if these beings had grown from the landscape itself. Due to the limitations of the technology available to his printers, the 1907–10 editions were produced in just two colors: black and yellow. Some of Bauer's original paintings for these prints were in full color.

In 1911, when Bauer again was asked to illustrate the book, he made it clear to the publisher that he wanted to retain his pictures along with the copyrights after publication. The publishing house had kept the original illustrations for the previous editions and considered them their property. Bauer was backed up in his request by other artists facing the same problem. The publishers did not budge from their position and without Bauer's illustrations, book sales dropped.

The publisher yielded to Bauer for the 1912 edition; he was again illustrating his own book. Printing techniques had also been updated and the pictures could be printed in three colors: black, yellow and blue. With this technical improvement, the prints almost resembled Bauer's original paintings.

Bauer illustrated the 1913–15 editions, printed in the same three colors as previously. 1913 marked the peak of his performance in these books, and Bauer's illustrations from that edition are among the most reproduced of his works. In 1914, his illustrations started to be influenced by the Italian Renaissance. At that time Bauer wanted to stop illustrating the series, but was contractually obligated to illustrate one more edition. 1915 was the last year he worked with trolls and gnomes; he said he "was done with them and wanted to move on". The war in Europe had altered Bauer's vision of the world and he stated that he could no longer imagine it as a fairy tale.

=== Tuvstarr ===
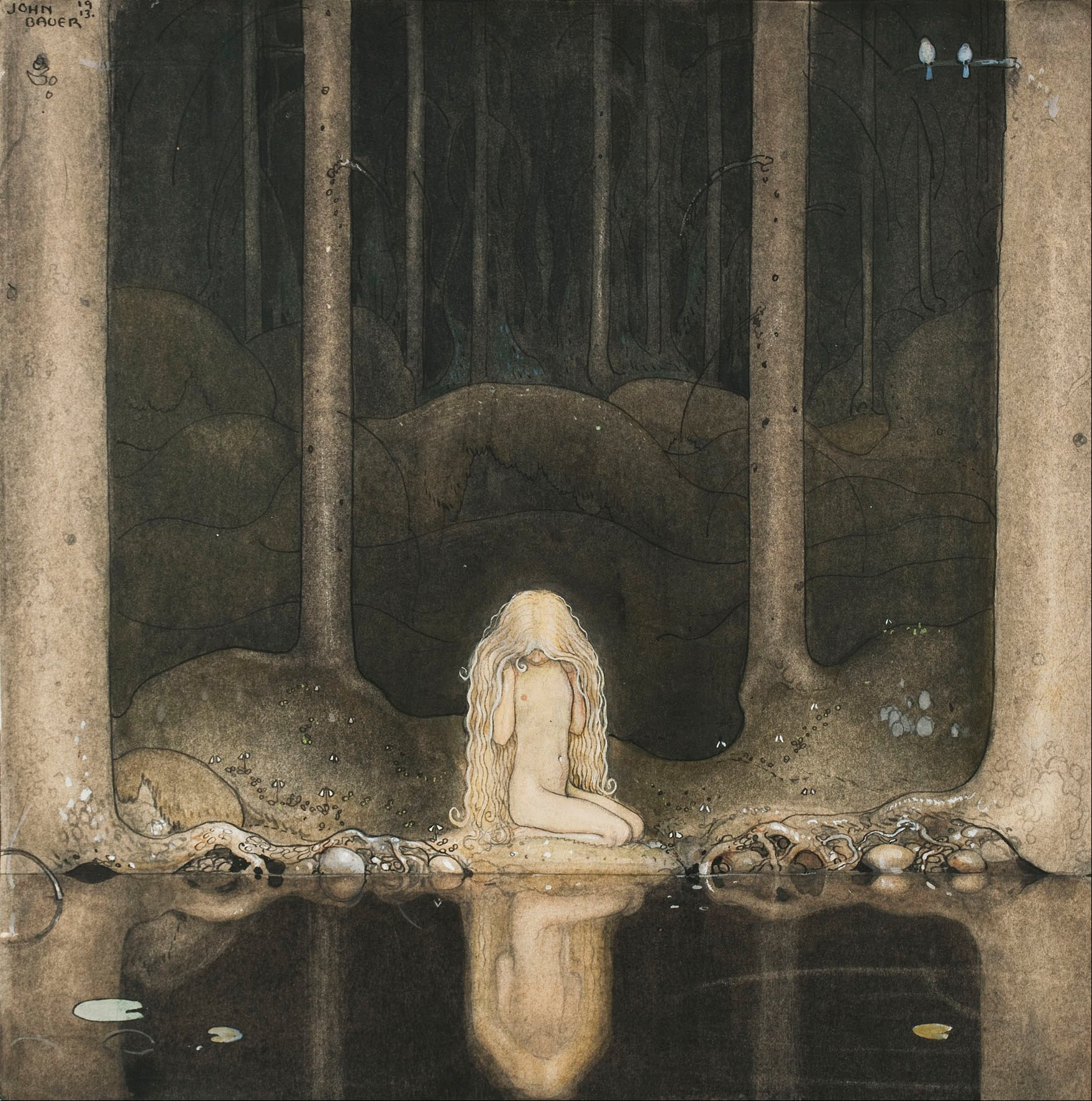
Still, Tuvstarr sits and gazes down into the water, 1913, watercolor

Ännu sitter Tuvstarr kvar och ser ner i vattnet (Still, Tuvstarr (Note: "Tuvstarr" is the Swedish common name for Carex cespitosa, a species of sedge.) sits and gazes down into the water), painted in 1913, is one of Bauer's most noted works.

Until the 1980s, the most reproduced and publicized of Bauer's works were two paintings depicting the princess and the moose from Sagan om älgtjuren Skutt och lilla prinsessan Tuvstarr (The Tale of the Moose Hop and the Little Princess Cotton Grass), published in 1913. The first picture is of the princess riding on the moose and the second is of the moose standing guard over the sleeping princess. They were mainly used as pictures on the wall in nurseries. The same tale also contains the picture of Tuvstarr gazing down into the tarn looking for her lost heart, an allegory of innocence lost. Bauer made several studies of this motif. During the 1980s the painting of Tuvstarr and the tarn was used in advertising for a shampoo. This started a debate in Sweden about how works of art, considered part of the national heritage, should be used. In 1999, the picture again appeared in advertising, this time in a manipulated version in which all the trees had been cut down and Tuvstarr seemed to be lamenting them. The award-winning advertising campaign was made by the Swedish Society for Nature Conservation and helped further the newly awakened environmental movement in Sweden. In his biography on Bauer, Gunnar Lindqvist argues that the picture has become too commercialized.

=== Oil painting ===
Bauer created most of his major works in oil at the beginning of his career, since this was the traditional technique taught at the Royal Swedish Academy of Arts. The trip to northern Sweden resulted in many sketches and watercolors for the Lappland book, but also in an oil on canvas entitled, Kåsovagge (1904). From 1903 to 1905, he made several portraits and landscapes influenced by Expressionism. He also made his first oil of Ester, The Fairy Princess, a painting with elements from the Pre-Raphaelites. This work indicates what kind of paintings Bauer wanted to do, but his commissions from illustrating "Among gnomes and trolls" got in the way. He wrote that he "felt like a Jack-of-all-trades", and made regular outbursts in letters to editors and publishers asking for his help, saying that he "had to work, he wanted a future painting in oil and the rest be damned". (Note: Bauer did not consider the illustrations he made to be (real) work, as opposed to oil paintings, just trifles he received money for doing.) By the time he ceased painting his trolls and gnomes, he was tired and worn out and turned to other venues such as scenography, writing a compendium on drawing to be used in schools, and starting with frescos. He never got to revisit oil painting fully before he drowned.

=== Large works ===
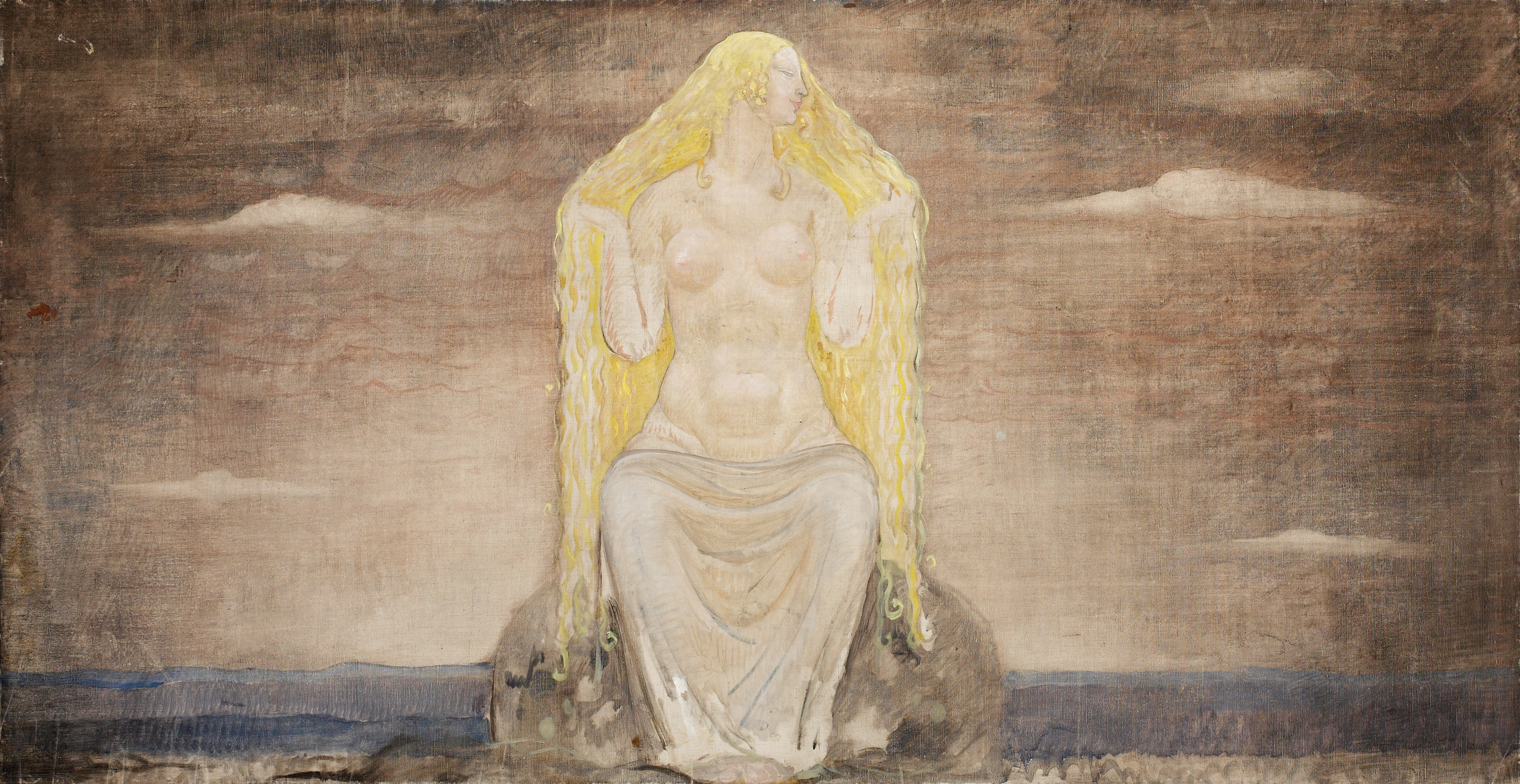
Freja, 1905, oil sketch

As in his earlier works at the academy, Bauer showed an interest in large frescos and, after his visit to Italy, this interest grew. His first chance to create a major work using this technique was in 1912, when he completed a 1.5-by-1.5-metre (4 ft 11 in by 4 ft 11 in) fresco-secco mural, Vill-Vallareman, at the home of publisher Erik Åkerlund. In 1913, he was asked to do a fresco for the Odd Fellows lodge in Nyköping, Den helige Martin (Saint Martin, the Holy). At the same time, the new Stockholm Court House was under construction. Contests regarding decorations for the building were held, and most of the noted Swedish artists at that time presented entries and suggestions. Bauer made a number of sketches for these competitions, but his confidence failed and he did not submit any of his drafts.

Bauer's last large work was an oil painting for the auditorium at the Karlskrona flickläroverk (The Karlskrona School for Girls) in 1917. It depicts Freja, the old Norse goddess of love, war and magic. Ester posed nude for the painting; Bauer shows her as strong, sensual and forceful. Their friends teasingly called it the "breast picture of Mrs. Bauer".

== Exhibitions ==
Some of the exhibitions of his work during his lifetime were:

- 1905 Gothenburg
- 1906 Norrkoping
- 1911 Rome
- 1913 Munich
- 1913 Dresden
- 1913 Brighton
- 1913 Stockholm
- 1914 Malmö
- 1915 San Francisco – Bauer was awarded the medal of honor.

Posthumous exhibitions include:

- 1934–45 Traveling exhibition
- 1968 Jönköpings läns museum, Jönköping
- 1973 Thielska galleriet, Stockholm
- 1981–82 Nationalmuseum, Stockholm
- 1993 Milesgården, Stockholm
- 1994 Göteborgs konstmuseum, Gothenburg

== Collections ==
The Jönköpings läns museum owns over 1,000 paintings, drawings and sketches by Bauer, which is the world's largest collection of his artwork. He is also represented at the Nationalmuseum in Stockholm, the Gothenburg Museum of Art and the Malmö konstmuseum. The John Bauer Museum in Ebenhausen, Germany is a museum dedicated to the life and works of Bauer.

== Works ==
For illustrations from the famous children's anthology, see Among Gnomes and Trolls

Other works

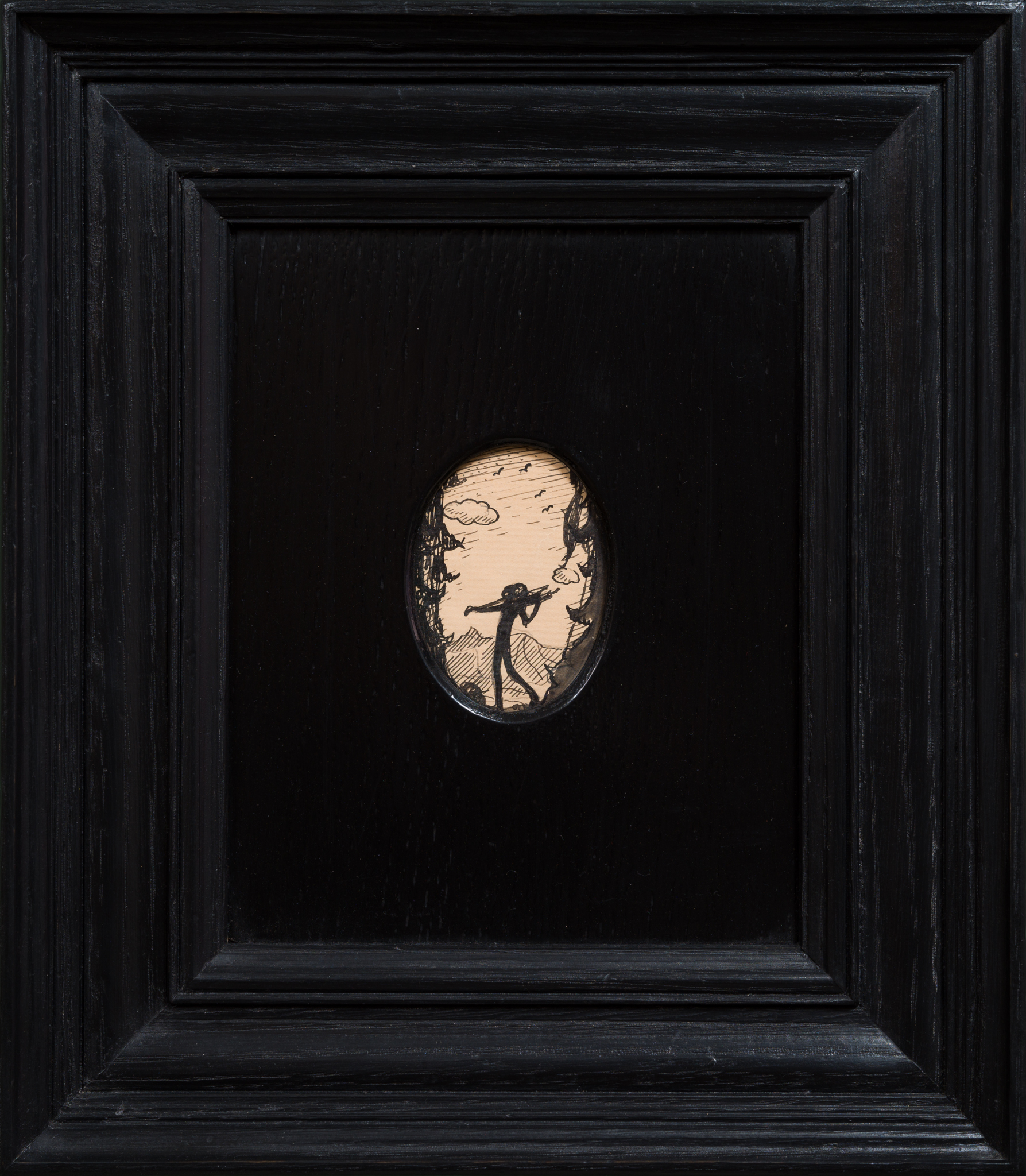
The Fiddler

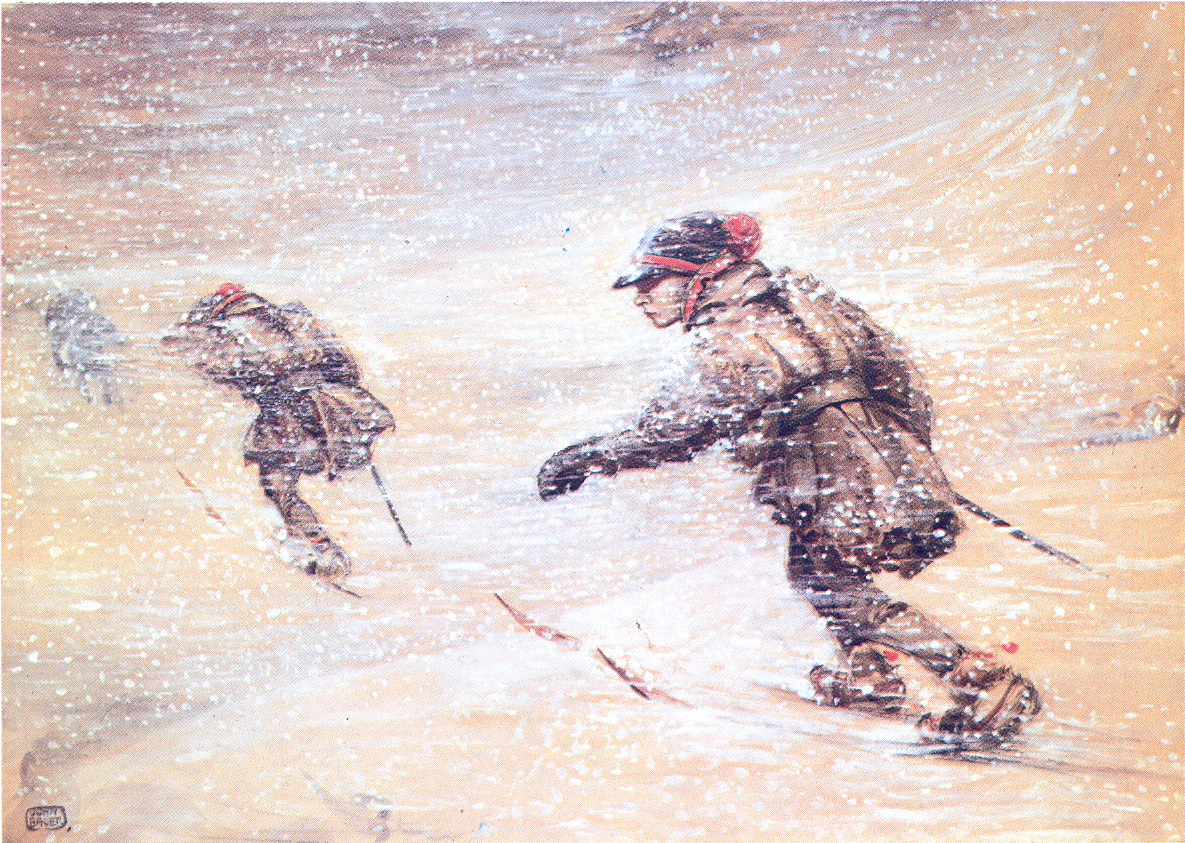
Lapplanders in snowstorm, 1904–1905, watercolor

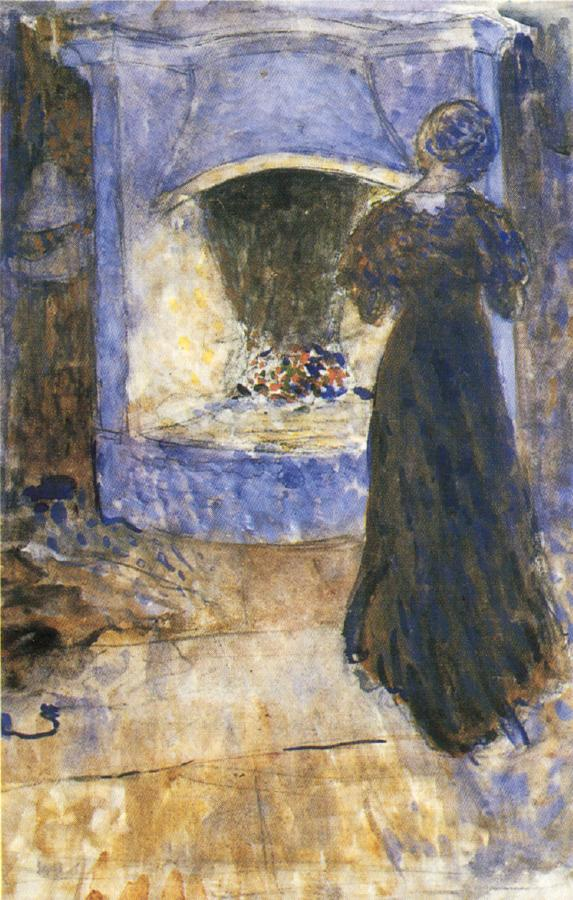
Ester in the cottage, 1907, watercolor

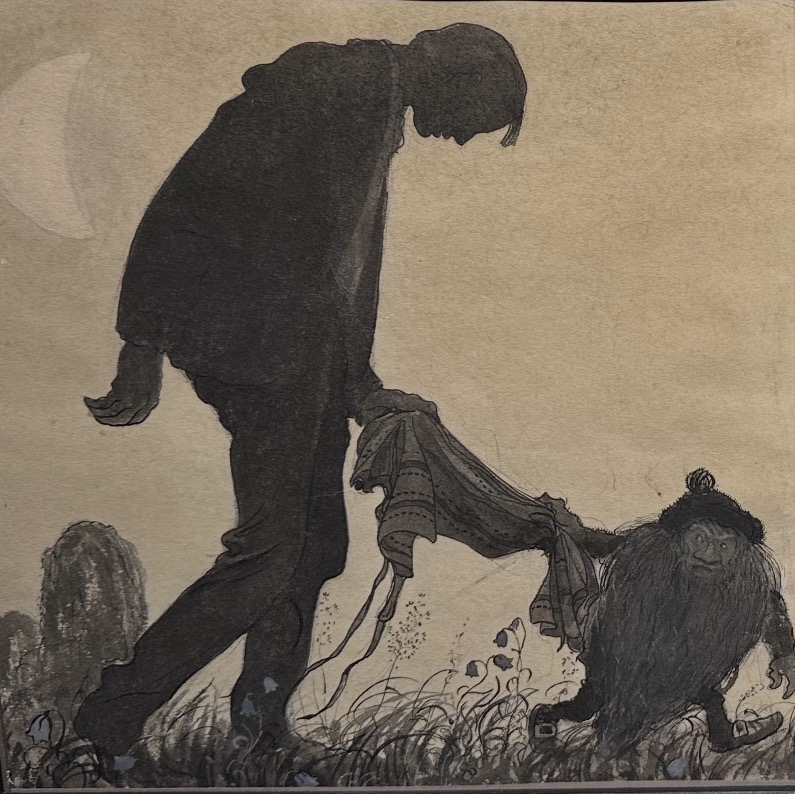
He led him over roads and paths, over mountains and hills. And all the while he slept, 1909

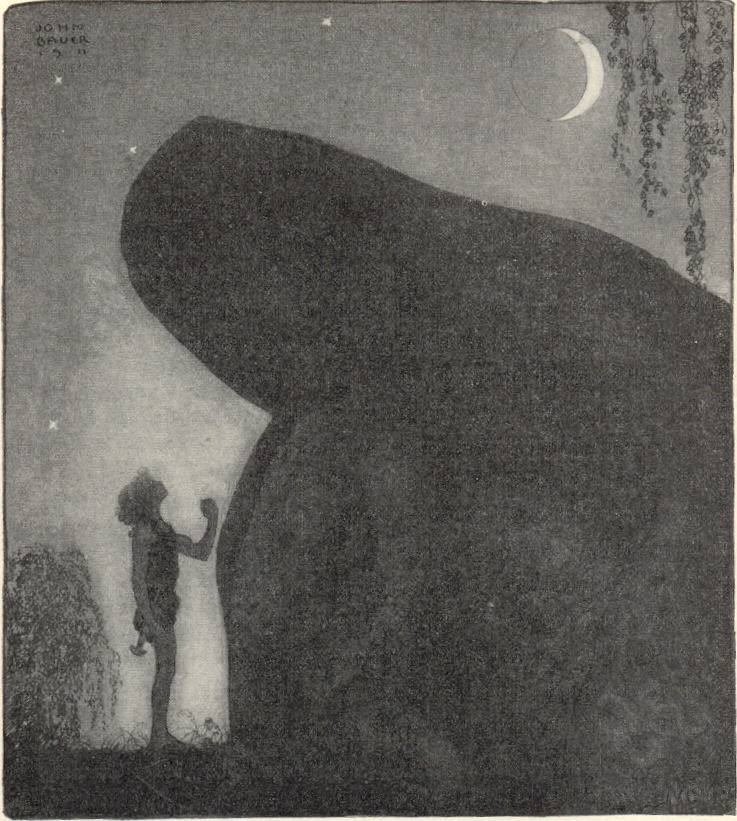
Wake up Groa, wake up Mother, 1911, watercolor

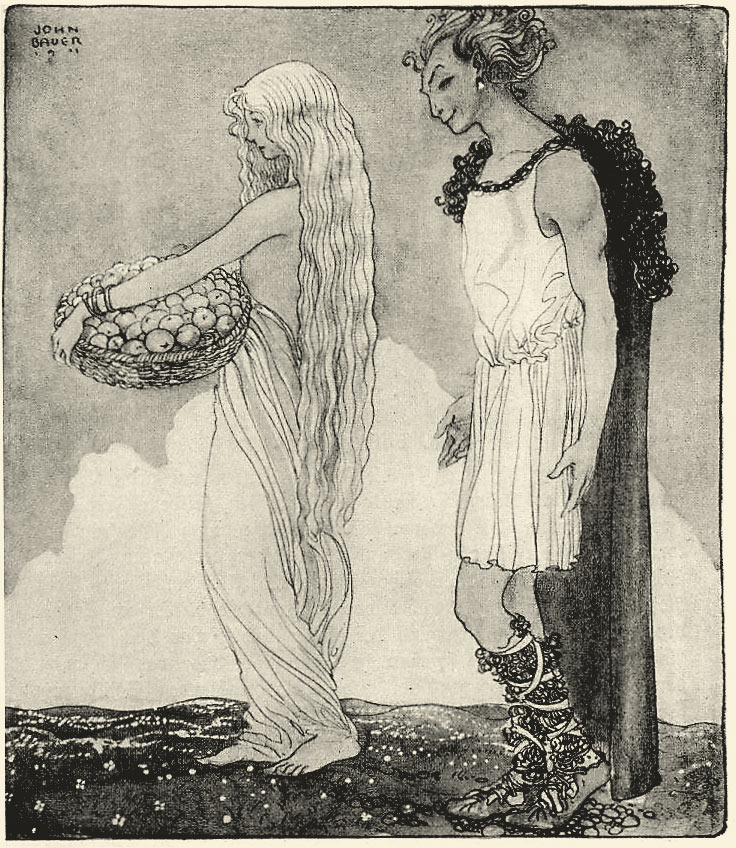
Loki and Idun, 1911

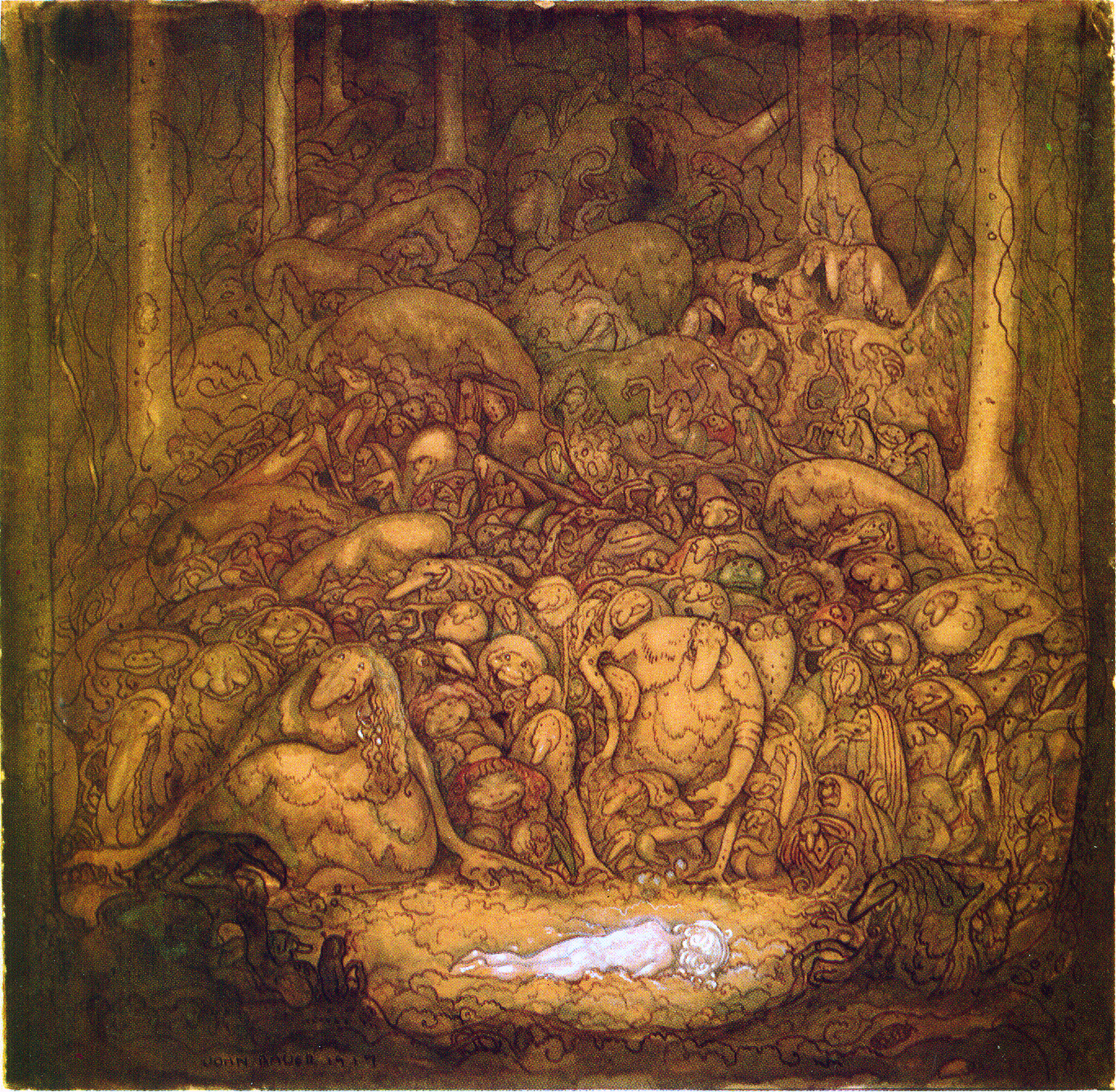
Root trolls, 1917, pen and wash drawing

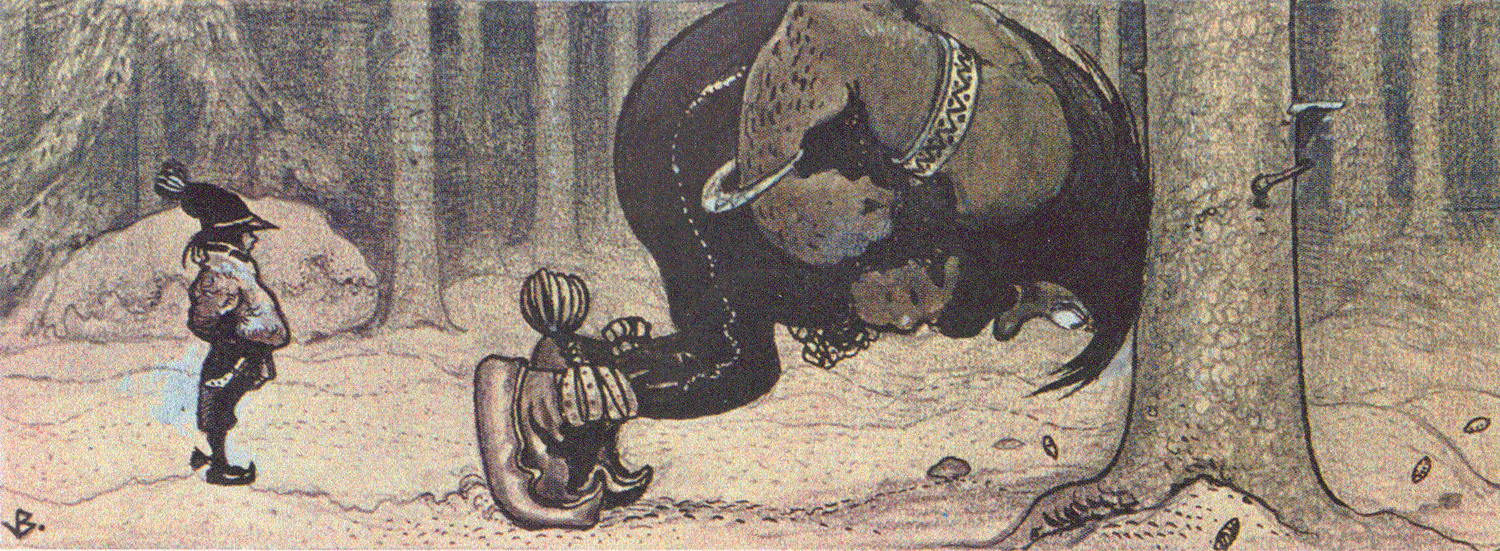
Stalo and the Sami boy Kauras, between 1904 and 1908

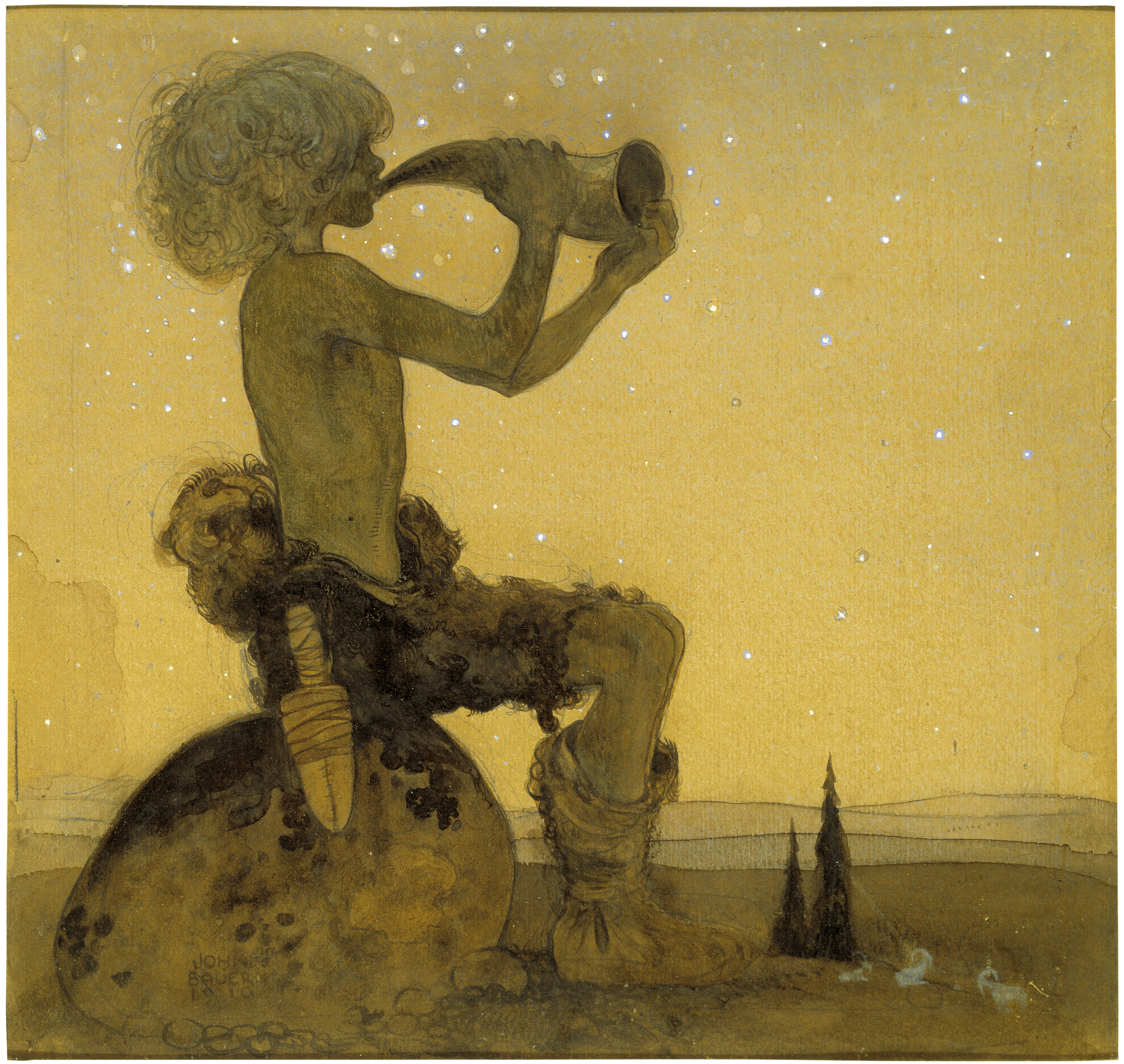
Vill Vallareman (Fairy Shepherd), 1910

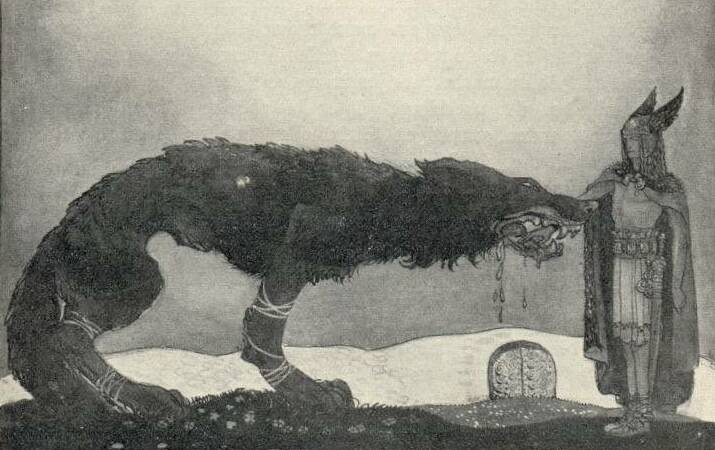
Tyr and Fenrir, 1911

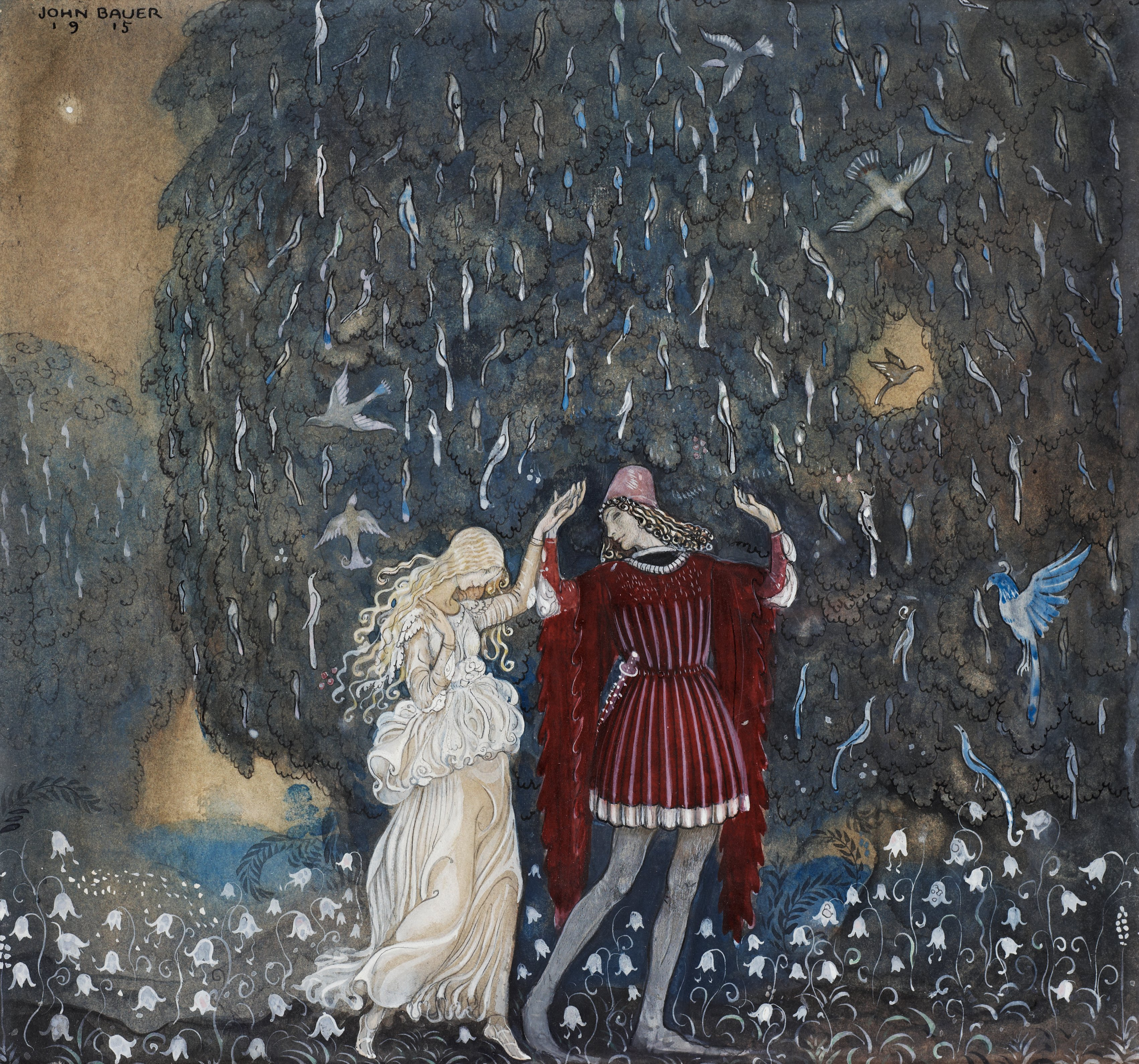
Lena dances with the knight, 1915

Written work

- Bauer, John (1928). Cyrus Granér; Karl Steenberg; Gottfrid Kallstenius (eds.). Ritkurs för Sveriges barndomsskolor [Drawing class for Sweden's schools for young children] (in Swedish) (1–12 ed.). Stockholm: Skolboks a.-b. De förenade.

== Self-reflection ==
Bauer consistently and privately doubted himself. He considered the praise he received for his pictures of trolls and princesses to be "a nice pat on the head for making funny pictures for children". He wanted to paint in oil and make what he called "real art", but he needed the money he received for his illustrations. His self-doubts were contrary to his public persona and how he presented himself in self-portraits: strong minded but self-deprecating.

== Legacy ==
Bauer's pictures continue to be popular at art auctions. At a sale in 2014, one of Bauer's gouaches, Humpe I trollskogen (Humpe in the Troll Forest), sold for 563,500 kronor (about US$87,000), and a watercolor, En riddare red fram (A Knight Rode Forth), made 551,250 kronor (c. US$85,100).

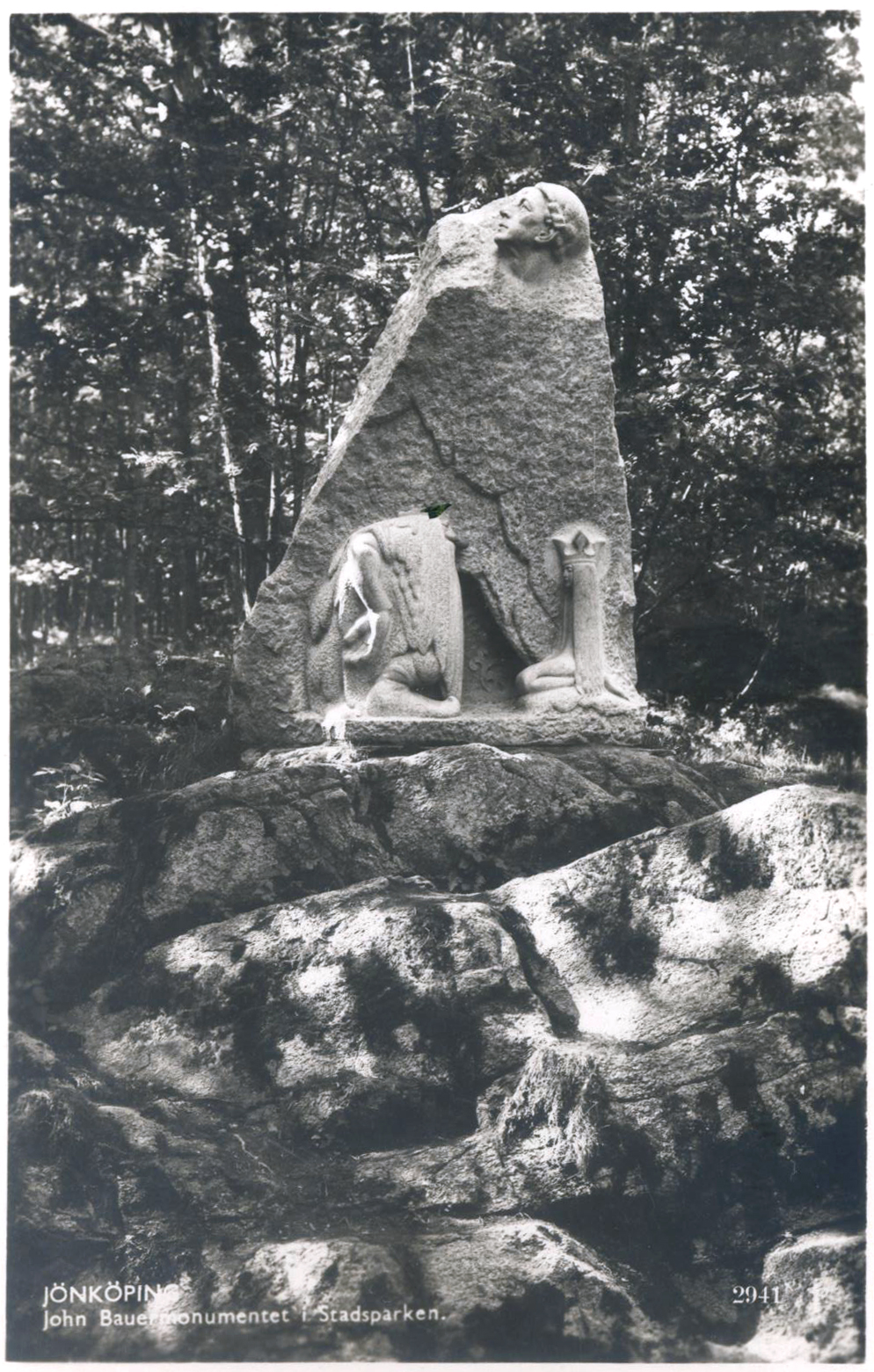
The John Bauer Monument in Jönköping

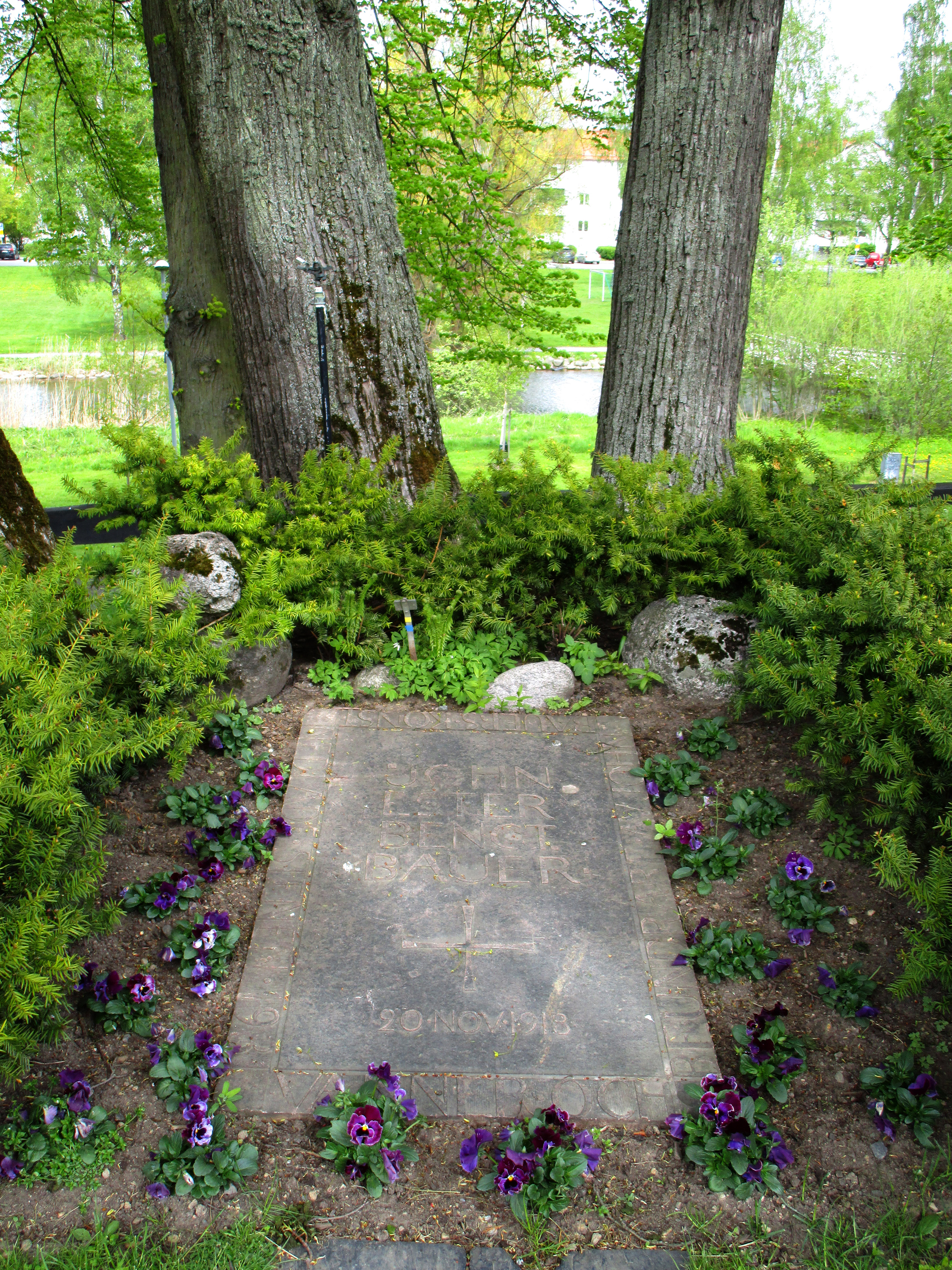
The grave of John, Ester and Bengt Bauer in Jönköping

His illustrations have been reprinted many times, and are considered among the classics in fairy tales. As of 2014, books with Bauer's pictures have been published in ten languages. Bauer's works have influenced Sulamith Wülfing, Kay Nielsen, Brian Froud, Rebecca Guay, and other illustrators. In his biography on Bauer, Gunnar Lindqvist states that: "Although Bauer's work is sometimes credited to have influenced that of Arthur Rackham, and vice versa, these artists did not come in contact with each other's works until the 1910s when they had already established their own style. Any similarities must therefore be credited to their common inspirations by the romantic Munich art of the late 1800s and the art of Albrecht Dürer."

In Jönköping, a memorial in honour of Bauer stands in the Town park, which was created in 1931 by Swedish sculptor Carl Hultström. Hultström also made a bust in bronze of Bauer, which sits in the National Portrait Gallery at Gripsholm Castle.

Celebrating John Bauer's centennial birthday in 1982, the Swedish postal service issued three stamps with motifs from Among Gnomes and Trolls. Four more were issued in 1997. A park and an adjacent street at the place where Villa Sjövik, Bauer's family home, once stood were named after him. The area is now part of the municipality of Jönköping. In Mullsjö a street was named after Bauer, and in Nyköping a square was named after him.

== Popular culture ==
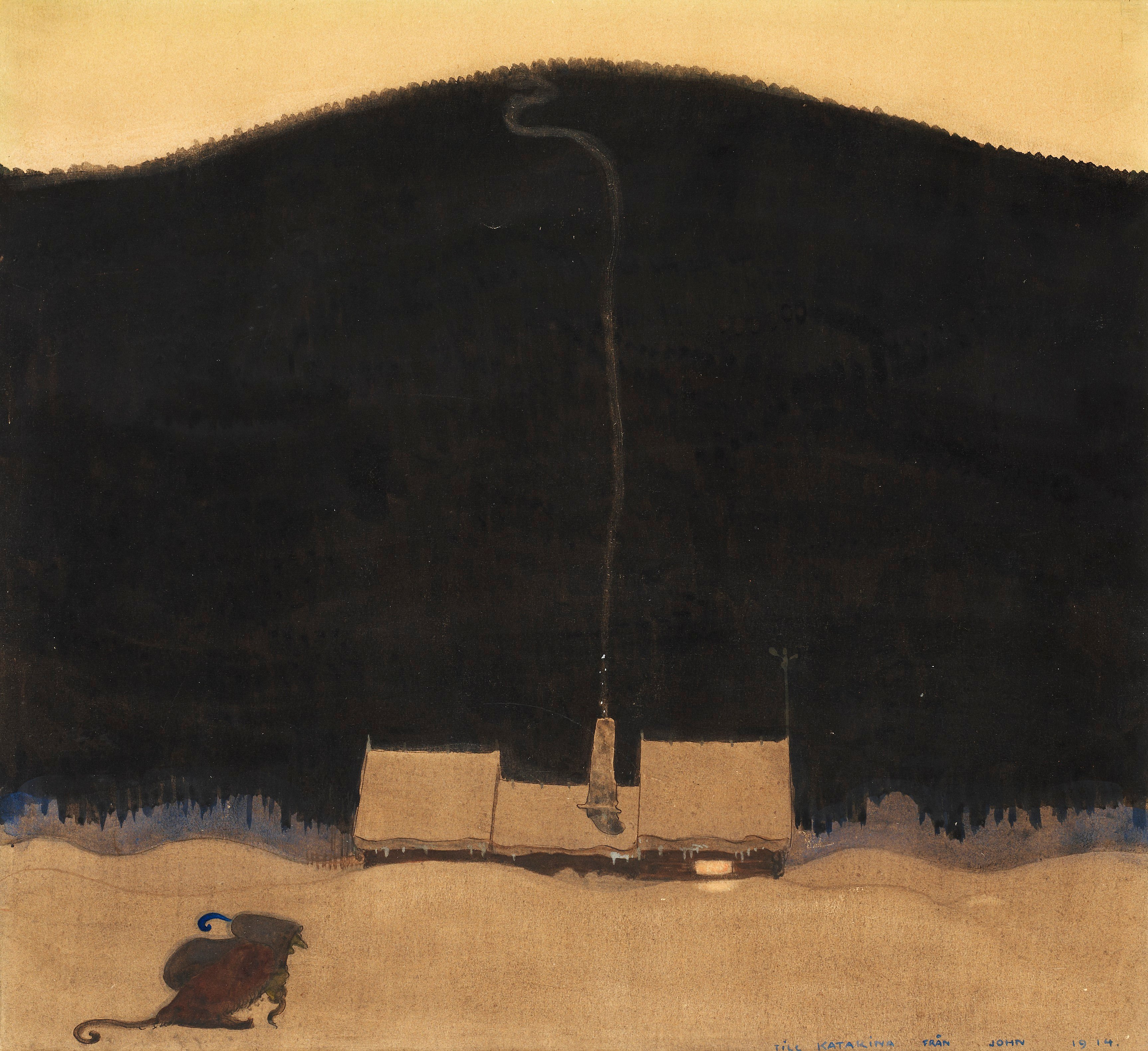
At dusk she often snuck out just to get a whiff of the good smell, 1914, watercolor

- In 1986, Sveriges Television produced and broadcast the movie Ester—om John Bauers wife (Ester—About John Bauers Wife). Ester was played by Lena T. Hansson, while John was portrayed by Per Mattsson.
- A short film for children about Bauer and storytelling, John Bauer, fantasin och sagorna (John Bauer, Fantasy and Tales) was made in 2013; created by Ulf Hansson, Kunskapsmedia AB, in co-operation with the Jönköpings läns museum and John Bauer Art HB.
- The Sveriges Television series Konstverk berättar (A Work of Art Tells a Story) featured the picture At dusk she often snuck out just to get a whiff of the good smell in the episode "The childhood picture", by Bengt Lagerkvist on 24 January 1977. The episode is available in Sweden through the Swedish Television Open Archive.
- A film project about John and Ester Bauer was started in 2012, by Börje Peratt. Called John Bauer—Bergakungen (John Bauer—The Mountain King), the movie focuses on the fairy tale artist and his love for Ester. Gustaf Skarsgård is slated for the role of Bauer.
- Swedish photographer Mats Andersson published a book where he revisited the forests of Bauer, using a camera instead of drawing. The pictures were also exhibited at the Abecita art museum in Borås in November 2013.
- Bauer is mentioned in Neil Gaiman's comic book series The Sandman.
- The visual look of the motion picture The Dark Crystal, directed by Jim Henson and Frank Oz, was developed by primary concept artist and chief creature designer, Brian Froud, who was inspired by Bauer's art.
- Italian musician Gianluca Plomitallo, a.k.a. "The Huge", made an album called John Bauer–Riddaren Rider, in which all the songs are named after pictures by Bauer.
- Norwegian Artist Mortiis uses the art of Bauer on his ambient albums.
- Swedish poet Roger L. Svensson recalls the Bauer Memorial and Bauer's creations in his poems.
- The 2019 horror movie Midsommar uses inspiration from his artwork and includes Bauer's piece "Stackars lilla basse!" early in the film.
- The Lush Caves from the popular sandbox game, Minecraft, were inspired by the Oskuldens Vandring painting.
- Netflix Original Chilling Adventures of Sabrina uses many works by Bauer throughout the Spellman Mortuary and The Academy of Unseen Arts.
