= Ester Ellqvist =

Swedish painter (1880–1918)

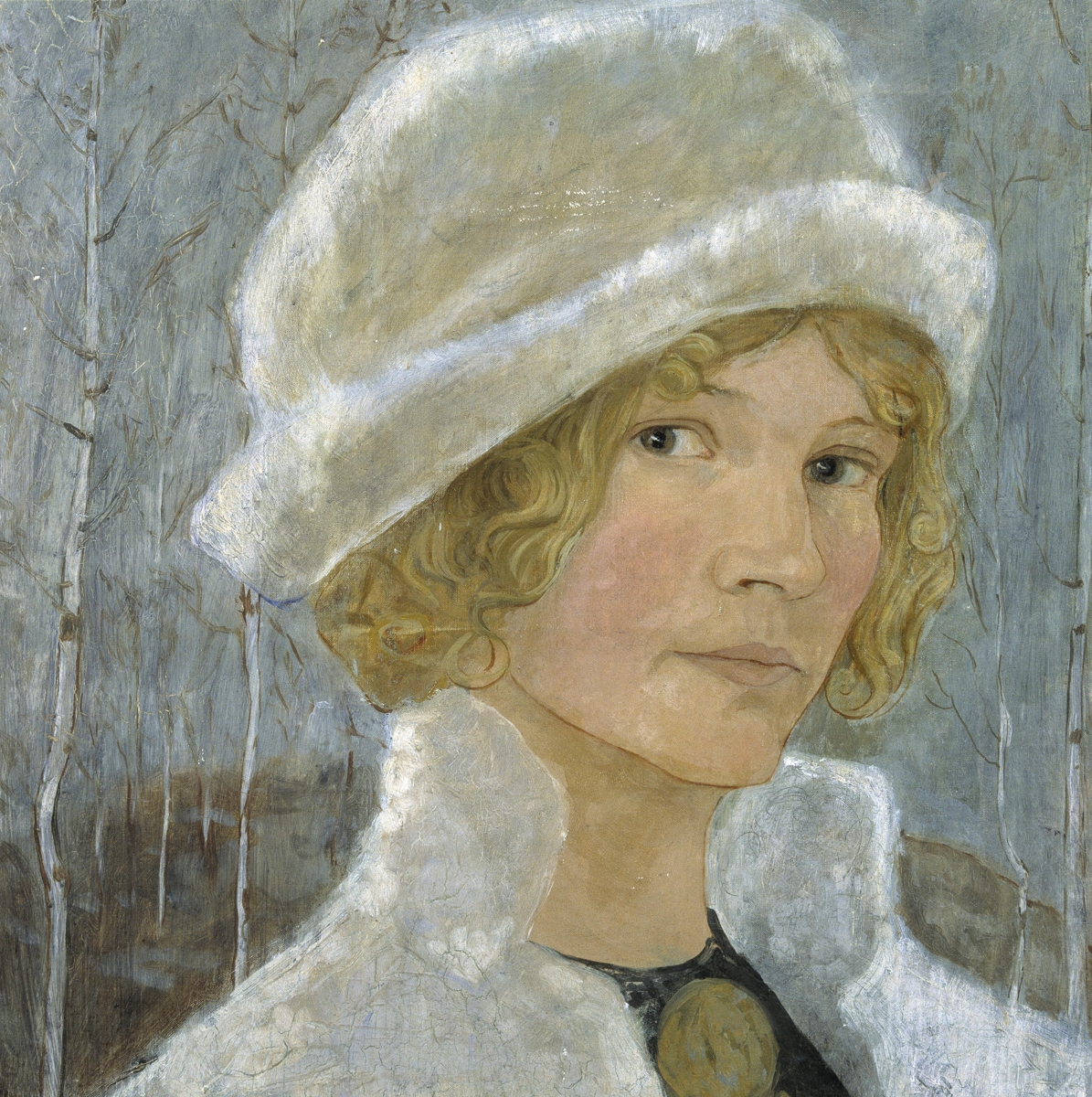
- Self-portrait, 1910
- Born: Ruth Ester Elisabet Ellqvist; 4 October 1880; Ausås, Sweden
- Died: 20 November 1918 (aged 38); Vättern, Sweden
- Resting place: Jönköping, Sweden
- Education: Royal Swedish Academy of Arts, Stockholm
- Movement: Modernism
- Spouse: John Bauer (m. 1906)

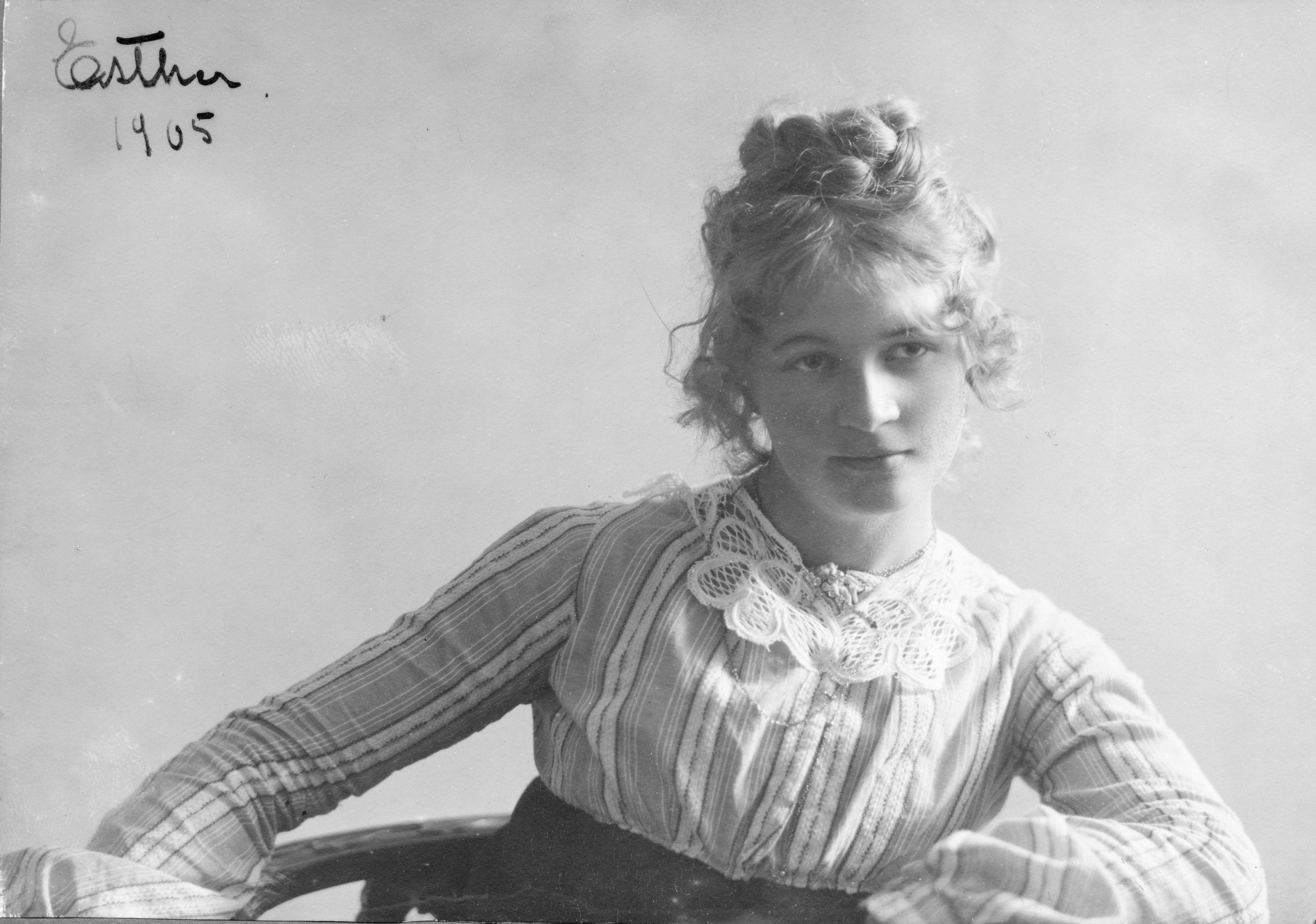
Ester Ellqvist photographed by her brother Oscar in 1905.

Ruth Ester Elisabet Ellqvist (4 October 1880 – 20 November 1918) was a Swedish artist and model. She studied at the Royal Swedish Academy of Arts and spent one year studying art in southern Germany and Italy with her husband. She died in 1918 with her husband and three-year-old son when the boat that they sailed on sank, killing all 24 people on board.

== Biography ==
=== Early life ===
Ester Ellqvist was born on 4 October 1880 in Ausås, Skåne, daughter of teacher Karl Kristersson Ellqvist, and raised in Stockholm. Ellqvist was a lively person who enjoyed the city's social life. In 1906 she married John Bauer, who was a painter and illustrator.

=== Education ===
Ellqvist studied in the late 1890s at the Technical School (later known as Konstfack) in Stockholm, to gain the skills that she need to gain acceptance at the Royal Swedish Academy of Arts. Her brothers Oscar and Ernst, who became photographers, and sister Gerda, who taught needlework, also attended the technical school.

In 1900 her studies commenced at the Royal Swedish Academy of Arts. The academy began accepting female students in 1864, but there was a different but not equal educational path for women. For instance, nude models were not used for female students. During her time at the academy she also attended classes at the A. Tallbergs school for etchers.

Ellqvist was an ambitious, skilled student during the early stages of the Modernist art movement, and at the end of the National Romanticism period, which was represented in the works of academy artists Carl Larsson, Anders Zorn, Bruno Liljefors and Richard Bergh. Ellqvist and her friends, were among the students of the academy who organized a protest against the conservative views of the school, which resulted in the creation of the influential Konstnärsförbundet (Artists Association).

She graduated in 1905.

=== Marriage ===
She met John Bauer at the Academy of Arts in 1900. They had periods of separation during which they sent each other letters exchanging their innermost desires and concerns. She married Bauer on 18 December 1906. In the beginning of their relationship they were tender and happy with each other. There were times when they were unhappy, partially because they had different aspirations. Ellqvist wanted to live near Stockholm and her husband enjoyed being near the forest. She posed as model for many of his works, like Fairy Princess in which she appears to be an innocent, pure, and unattainable woman. In 1908, financed by Bauer's father, they traveled through southern Germany and Italy for one year to study art.

Works by John Bauer

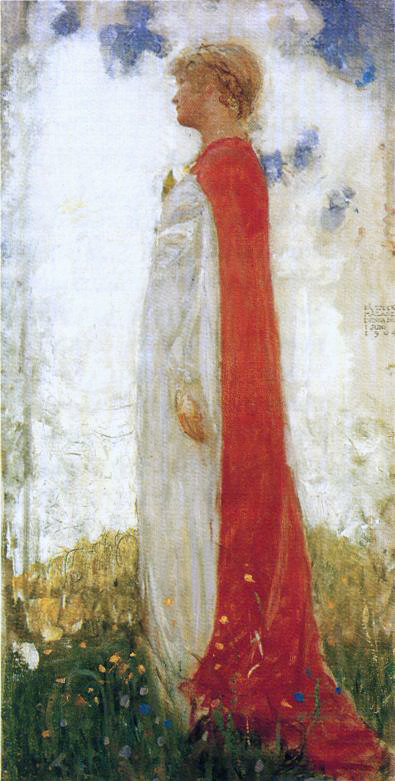

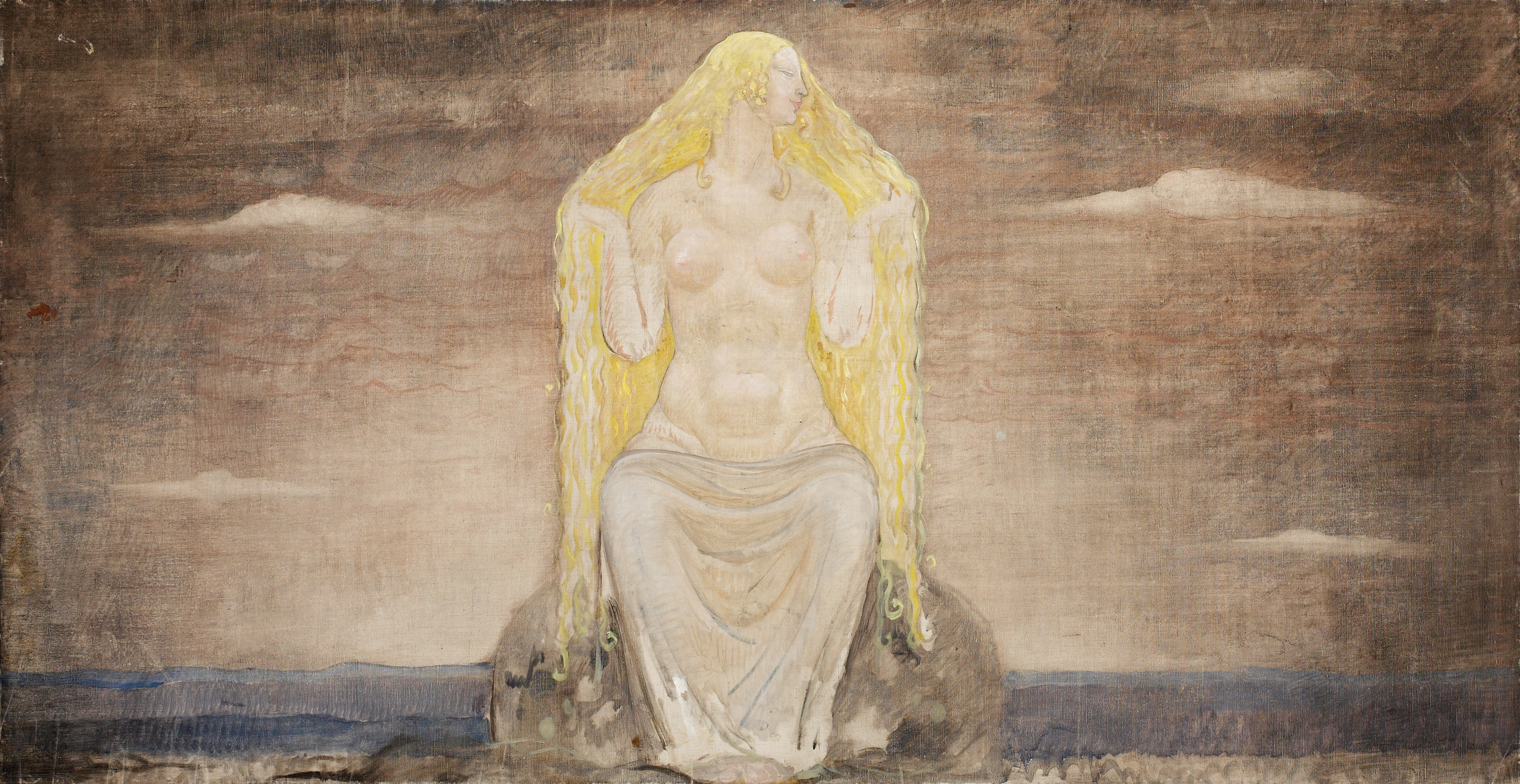

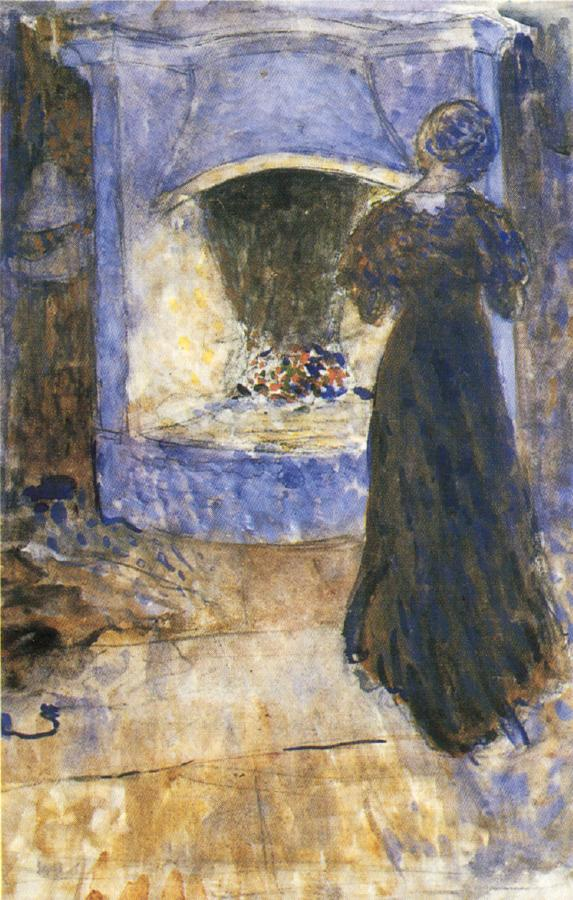

From left to right:
- The Fairy Princess, 1904, oil sketch
- Freja, 1905, oil sketch
- Ester in the Cottage, 1907, watercolor

Ellqvist and Bauer had a son Bengt, who they called "Putte". He was born in 1915.

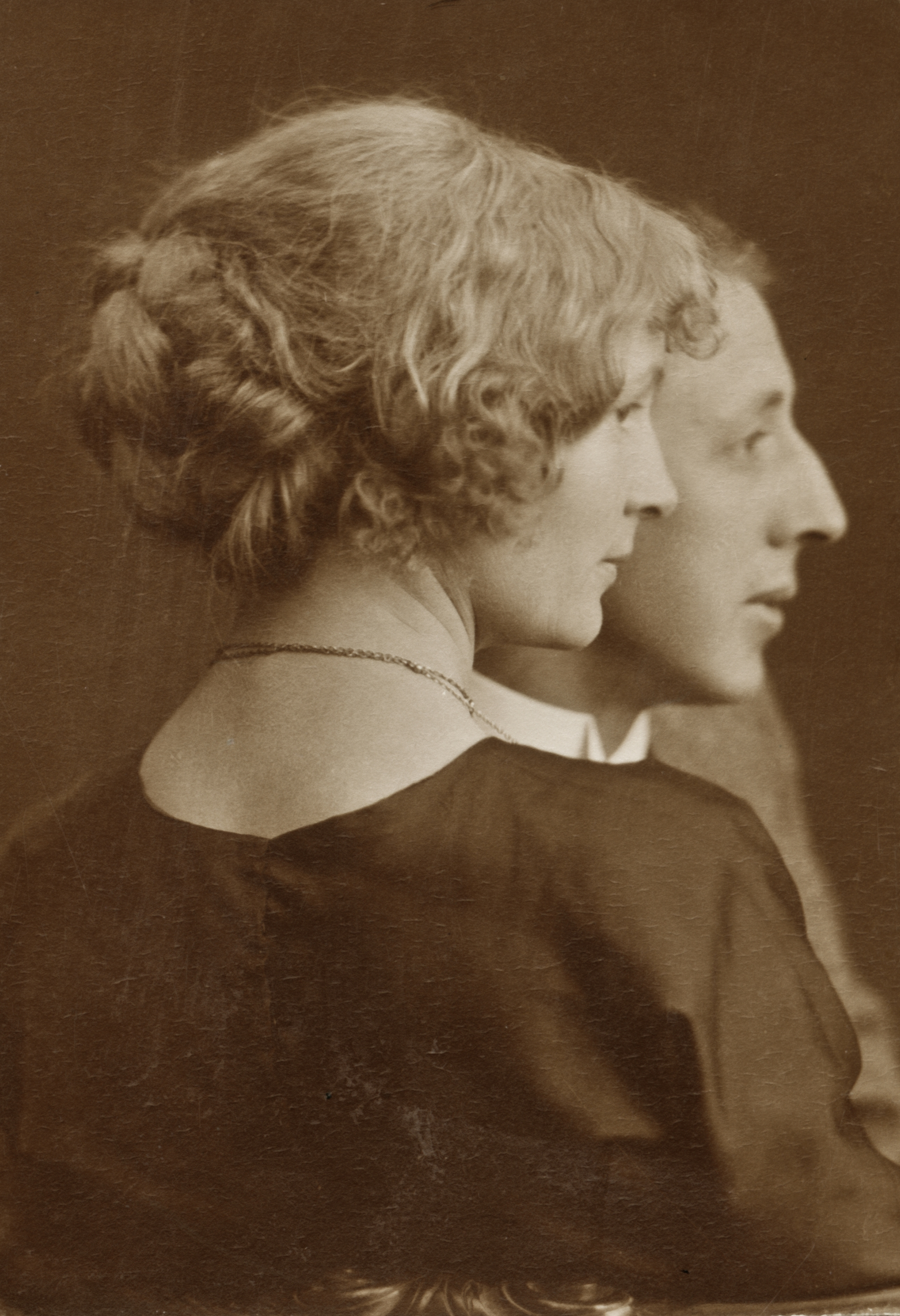
Ester Ellqvist and John Bauer

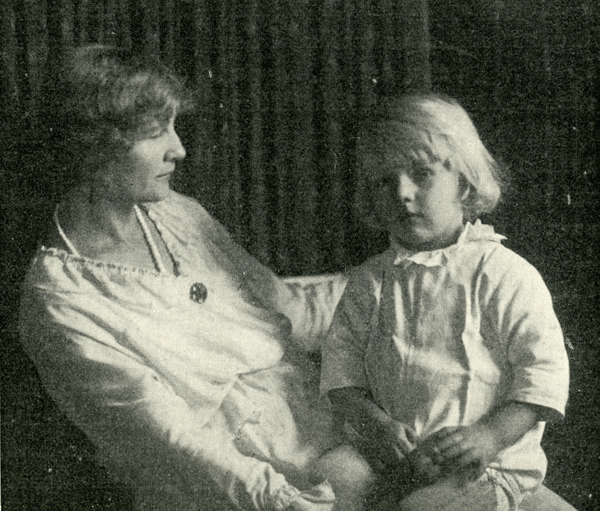
Ester and her son, Putte

By 1917, their marriage was in trouble and their love for each other began to dwindle. Ellqvist had essentially given up her own artistic aspirations for her role as a wife.

=== Death ===
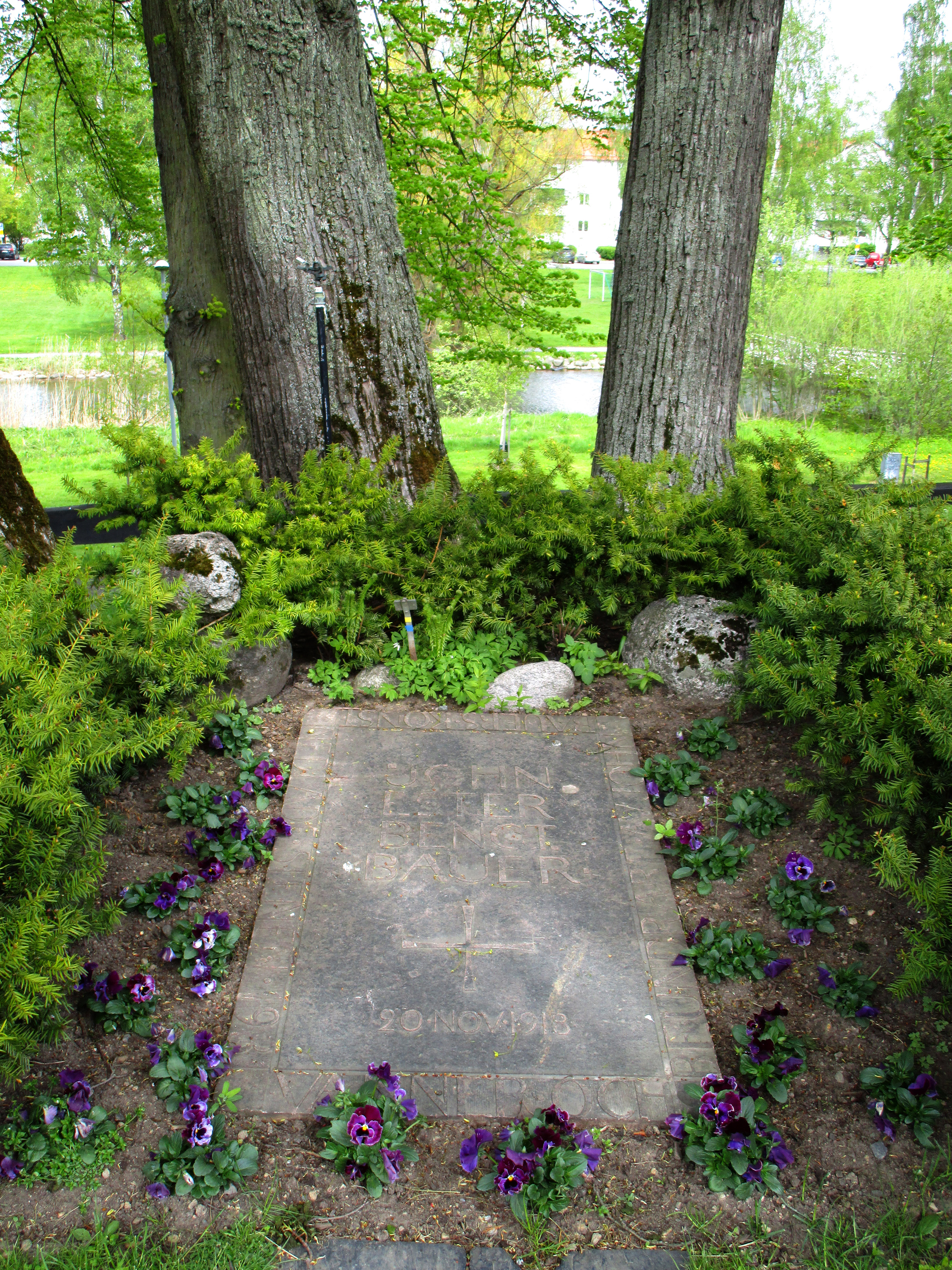
Grave of Ester Ellqvist, John Bauer and their son Bengt

Ellqvist, Bauer and their three-year-old son died on 20 November 1918 when the SS Per Brahe sailing to Stockholm sank in Lake Vättern, killing all 24 people (8 passengers and 16 crew members) on board. On 18 August 1922, the Bauers were buried at the Östra cemetery in Jönköping (in quarter 04 plot number 06).

== Career ==
Her self-portrait is the cover for Bakom maskerna: det dolda budskapet hos kvinnliga 1880-talsförfattare (Behind the masks: the hidden message in female 1880s writer).

Works by Ester Ellqvist

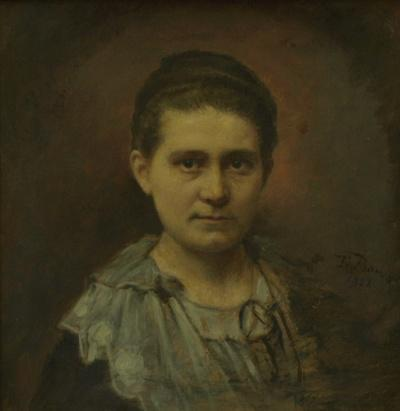

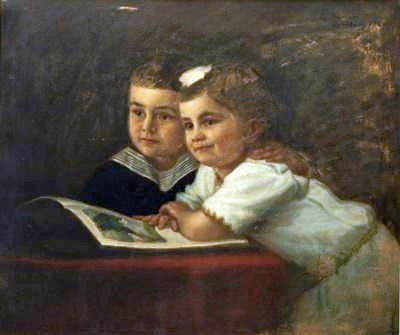

From left to right:
- Porträtt av en ung kvinna med rysch (Portrait of a young woman in ruffles)
- Dubbelporträtt av barn (Double portrait of children)

== In popular culture ==
In 1986, Sveriges Television produced and broadcast the movie Ester – om John Bauers hustru ("Ester – About John Bauer's Wife). Ester was played by Lena T. Hansson and John was portrayed by Per Mattsson. The movie was directed by Agneta Elers-Jarleman.
