= Alfred Thörne =

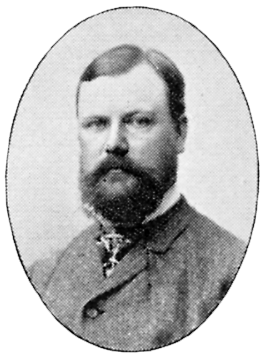
Alfred Thörne; Svenskt Porträttgalleri XX

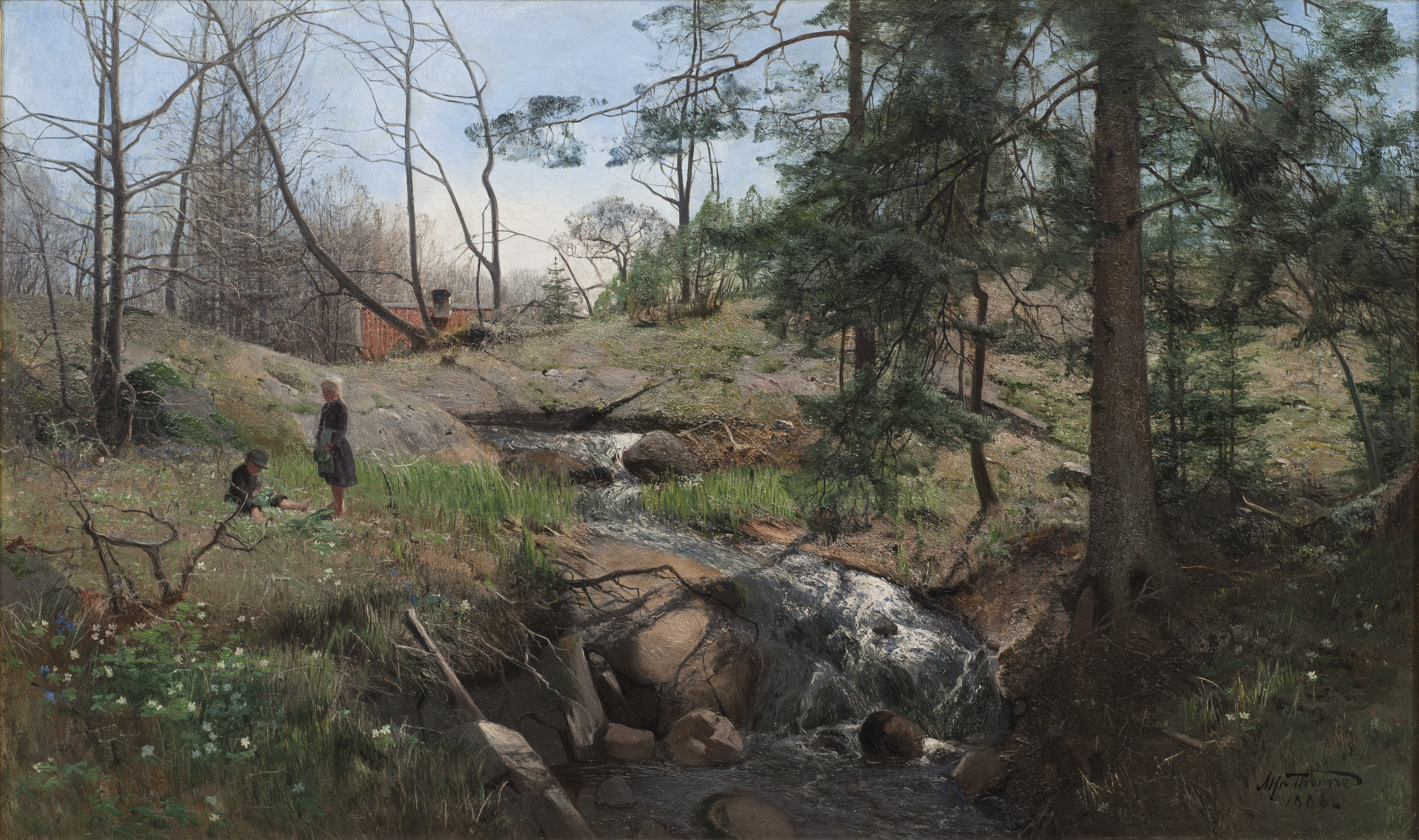
Spring in the Country

Sven Alfred Thörne (24 April 1850 – 15 March 1916) was a Swedish landscape painter.

== Biography ==
Thörne was born at Horn. His father, Sven Petter Thörne, was a cobbler. From 1874 to 1880, he studied at the Royal Swedish Academy of Fine Arts with Per Daniel Holm. The year he graduated, he was awarded a royal medal for one of his landscapes. The following year, he became an agré (a type of member candidate) at the Academy. In 1884, he received scholarship that enabled him to make a study trip to Germany, France, Italy and Belgium. He returned to Sweden in 1886 and, in 1891, married Matilda Josefina Wahlberg.

He participated in the Nordic Exhibition of 1888, the Gothenburg Exhibition of 1891, and the World's Columbian Exhibition of 1893. He and Olof Hermelin held a joint exhibition in Stockholm in 1910. A memorial exhibition at the Konstnärshuset took place shortly after his death in Stockholm.

In addition to his paintings, he created an altarpiece for Vimmerby Church and some of his works were used as illustrations in Lappland. Det stora framtidslandet (Lappland; The Great Land of the Future, 1908), edited by Olof Bergqvist and Fredrik Svenonius. His favorite areas for landscapes were Mälardalen, Dalarna and Bergslagen. he occasionally worked as a drawing teacher.

His works may be seen at the Nordiska museet, the Nationalmuseum, the Norrköpings konstmuseum, Sundsvalls museum, and several others.
