= Olof Hermelin =

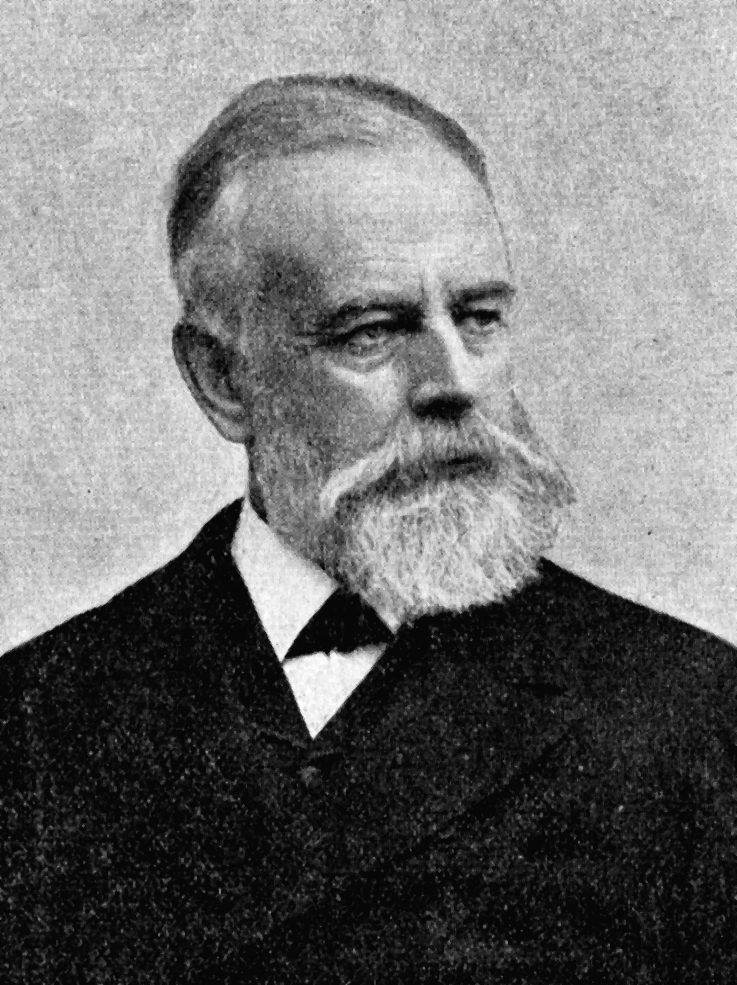
Olof Hermelin, photograph from Kamraten (1898)

Olof Hermelin (8 February 1827, in Säby Parish, Småland – 3 December 1913, in Stocksund) was a Swedish painter, author and landowner.

== Biography ==
His grandfather was the cartographer, Samuel Gustaf Hermelin and his father was the baron August Söderling Hermelin, who adopted his mother's surname as his middle name because he inherited Gripenberg Castle from her family.

Olof studied at Uppsala University and the military school in Stockholm; joining the Halland Regiment in 1848. He was promoted to Lieutenant two years later. His military career turned out to be short-lived, however, as he resigned the following year and settled down on his property in Råby-Rekarne Parish, Österby. During his time in Stockholm, he had taken classes from the landscape painter, Tore Billing, at the Royal Swedish Academy of Fine Arts, and had decided to pursue a career as an artist instead.

In 1852, he married Malin Lucie Liljenstolpe, from another landed family.

He made study trips to Copenhagen, Düsseldorf, Paris, Belgium and the Netherlands in 1870. Three years later, he revisited Düsseldorf and Paris and made a first visit to London. While in France, he was exposed to the work of the Barbizon School, which had a major influence on his future style. Part of this involved the practice of painting en plein aire.

He was also an author; producing not only works about art, but short stories and plays as well. An interest in archaeology led him to publish a scientific study about the Viking Age excavations on the island of Birka.

In 1871, he was named an "agré" (a type of member candidate) at the Royal Academy and, in 1876, served as the Commissioner for the Swedish art exhibit at the Centennial Exposition in Philadelphia. In 1885, he joined with numerous other Swedish artists in a group known as the Opponenterna, which was opposed to what they felt were the archaic teaching methods in use at the Academy.

His works may be seen at the Nationalmuseum and the Göteborgs konstmuseum, among several others.

== Selected paintings ==
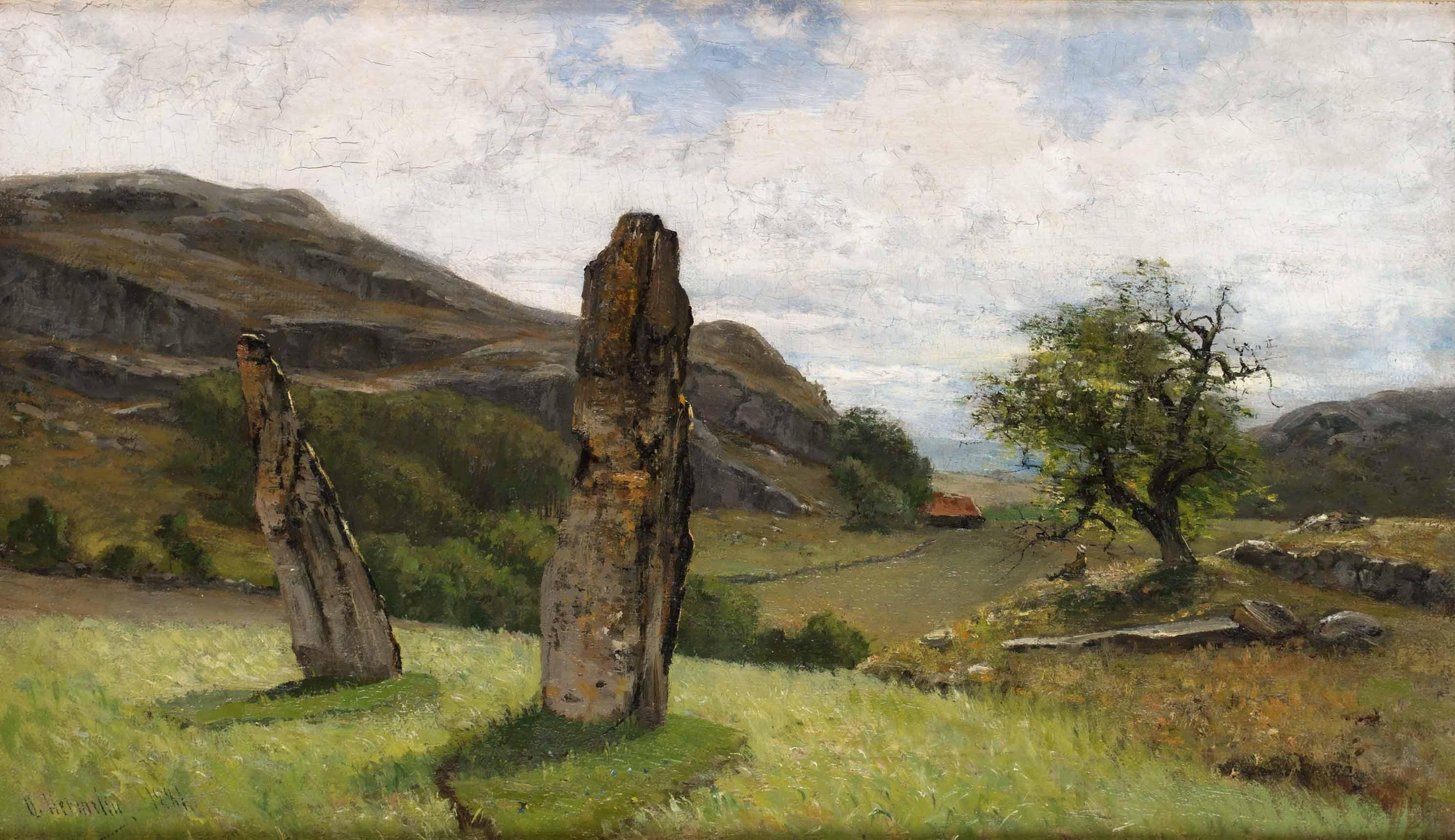
Menhirs in Bohuslän

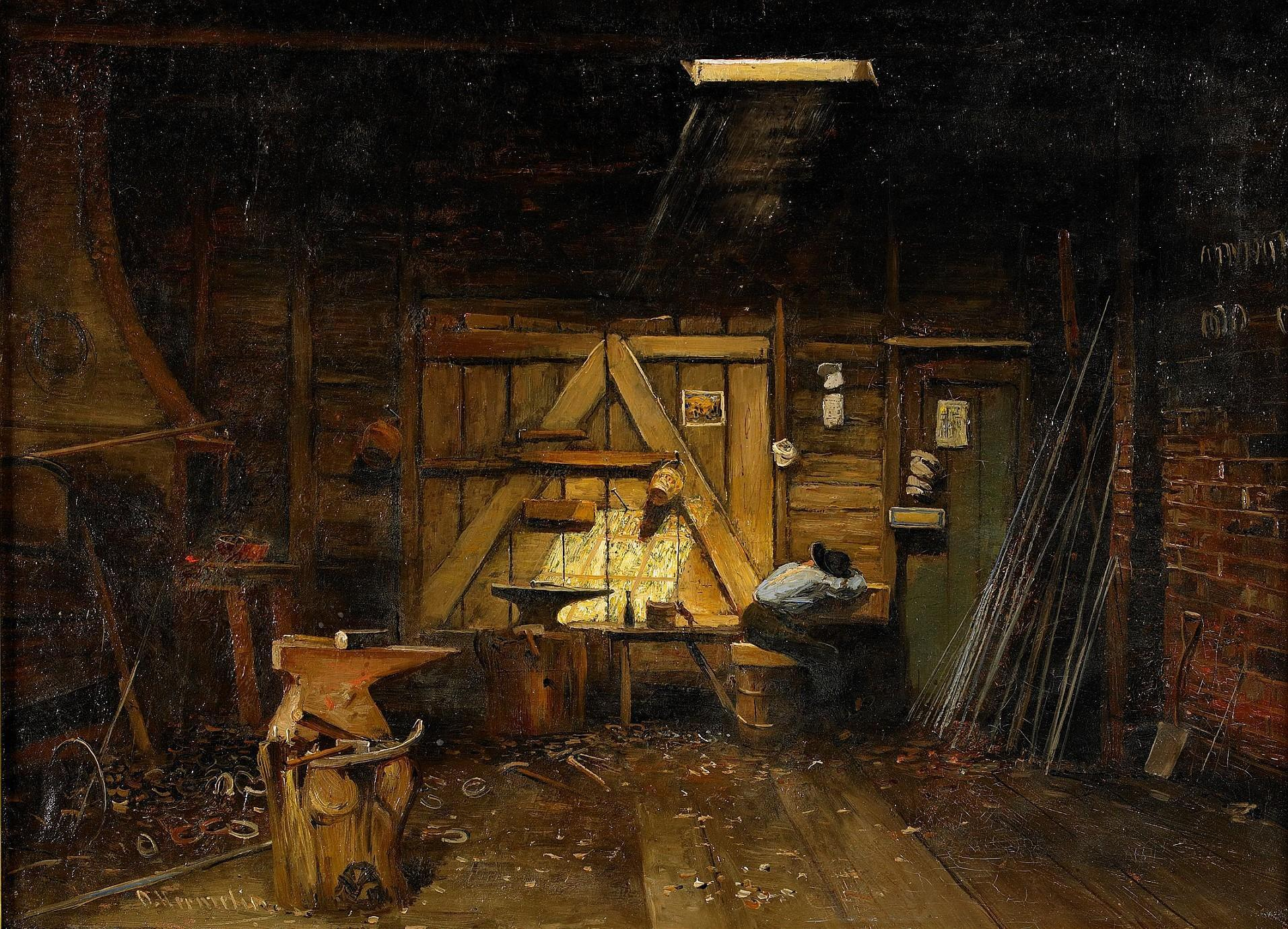
An Old Blacksmith in Uppland

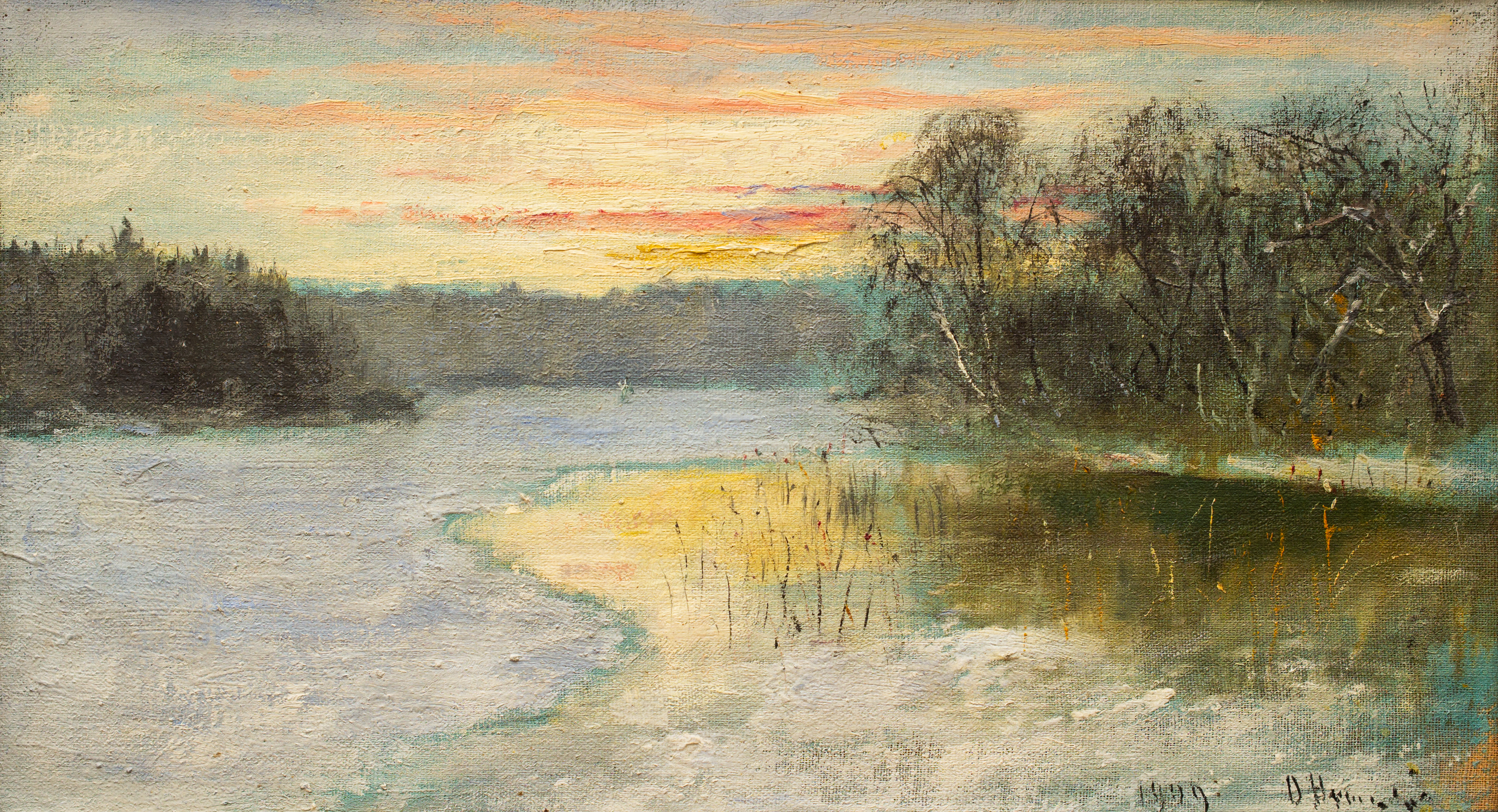
Lilla Värtan

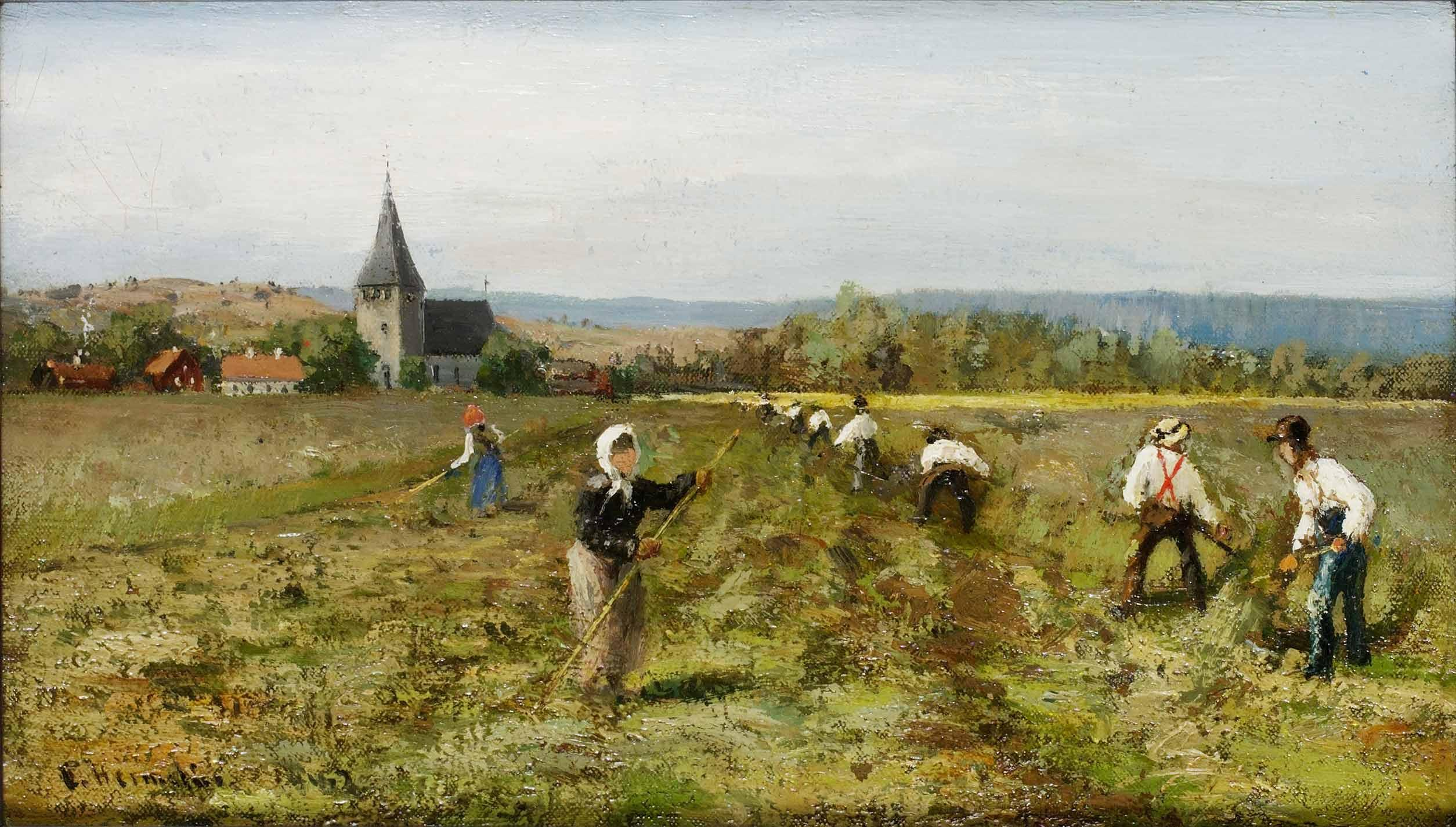
Landscape with Harvesting Farmers

== Other sources ==
- Gabriel Anrep, Svenska adelns Ättar-taflor (genealogy), 1871-1882, Abrahamsson-Granfelt, Stockholm
