= November 1918 =

Month in 1918

<<	November 1918					>>
Su	Mo	Tu	We	Th	Fr	Sa
					1	2
3	4	5	6	7	8	9
10	11	12	13	14	15	16
17	18	19	20	21	22	23
24	25	26	27	28	29	30

The following events occurred in November 1918:

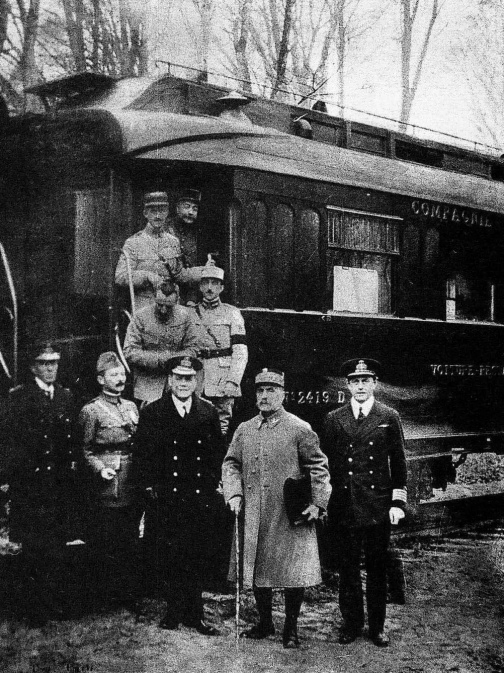
Field Marshal Ferdinand Foch stands with his staff outside the rail carriage where the armistice ending World War I was signed.

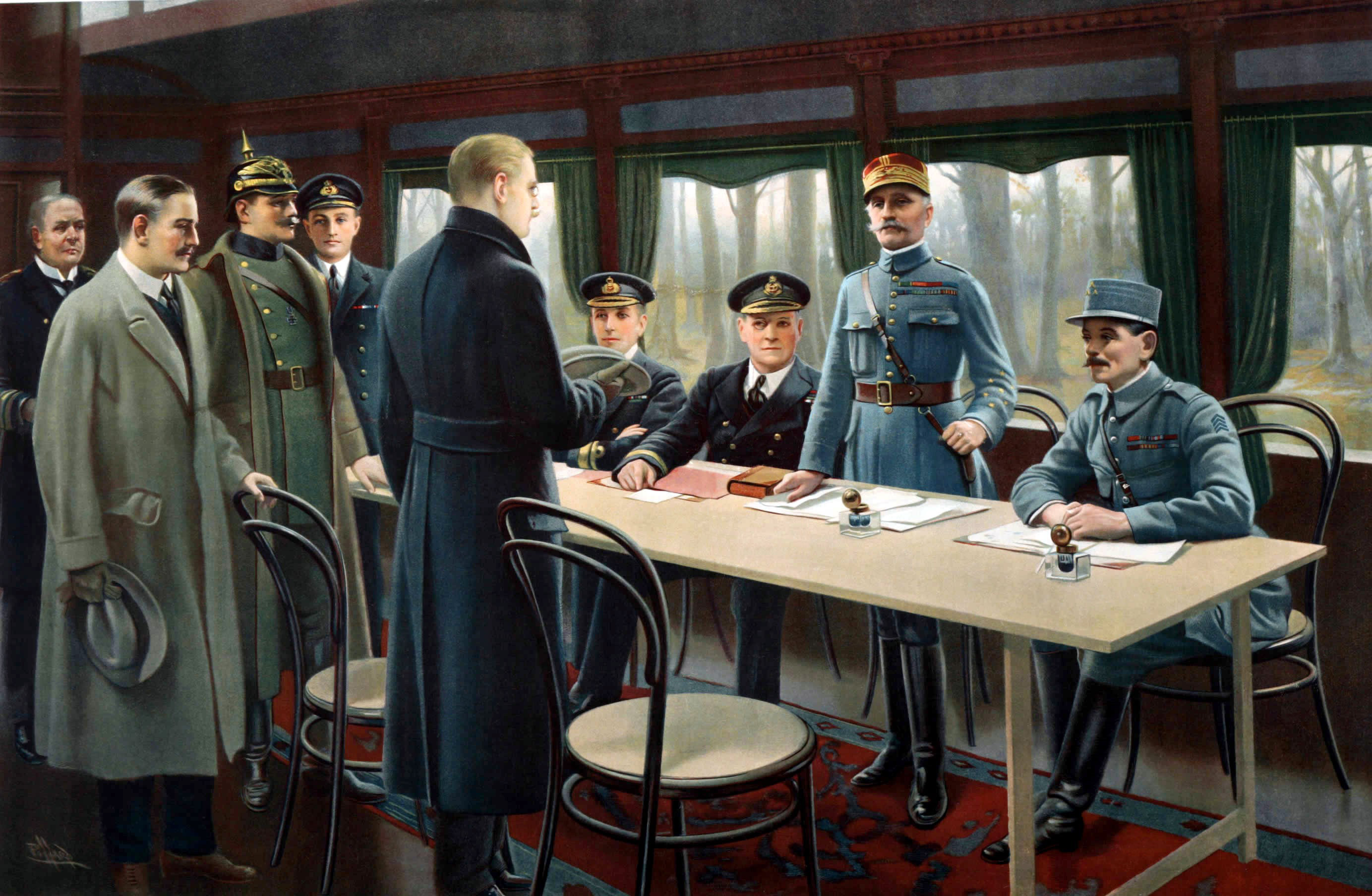
Painting depicting the signing of the armistice. Behind the table, from right to left, General Chief of Staff Maxime Weygand, Field Marshal Ferdinand Foch (standing) and Royal Navy Admiral Rosslyn Wemyss and fourth from the left, Royal Navy Captain Jack Marriott. In the foreground, Matthias Erzberger, representing the new German government, Major-General Detlof von Winterfeldt (with helmet) of the Imperial German Army, Alfred von Oberndorff, a diplomat at the Foreign Ministry, and Captain Ernst Vanselow of the Imperial German Navy.

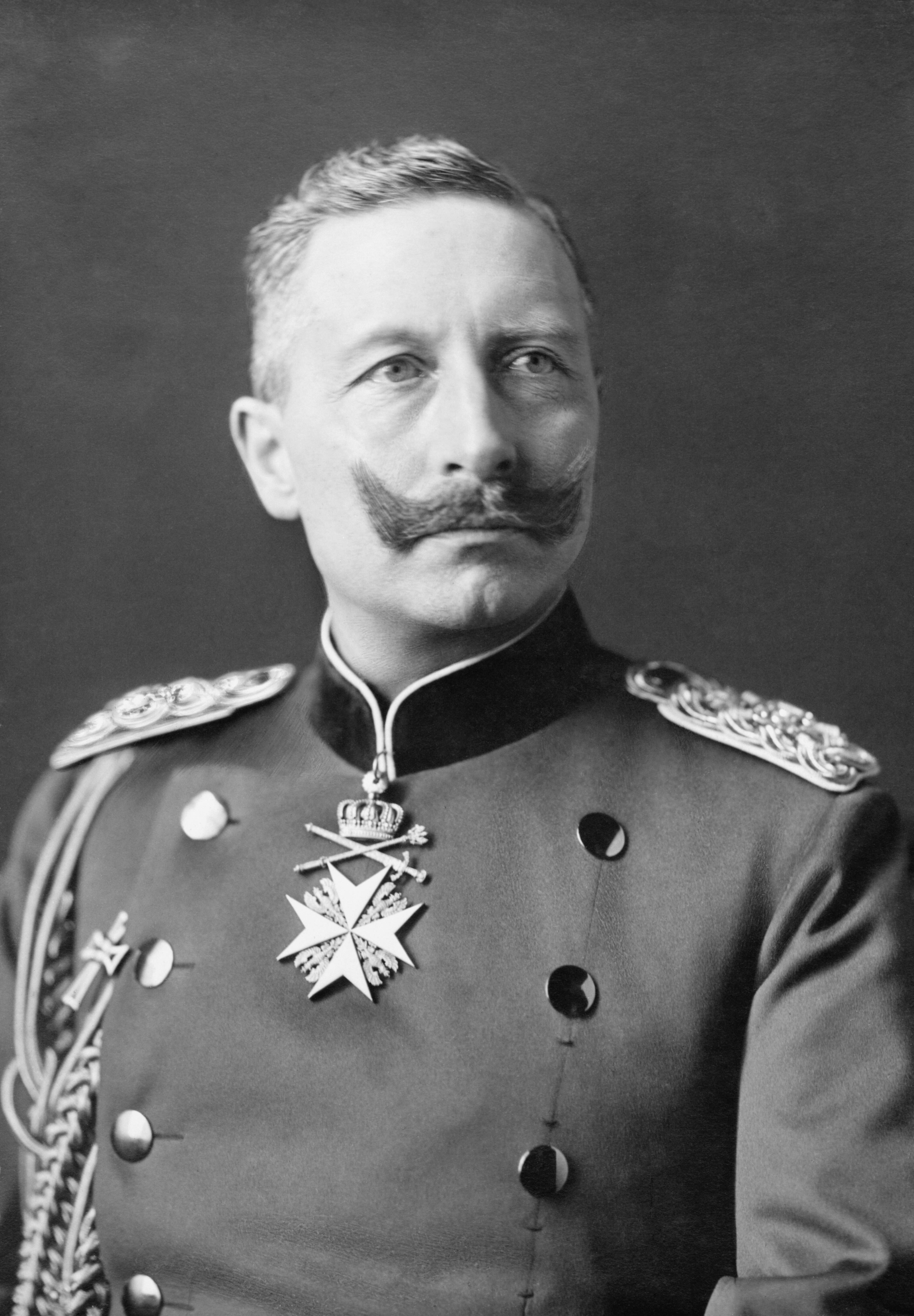
Wilhelm II, German Emperor, abdicates his throne and flees to the Netherlands.

== November 1, 1918 (Friday) ==
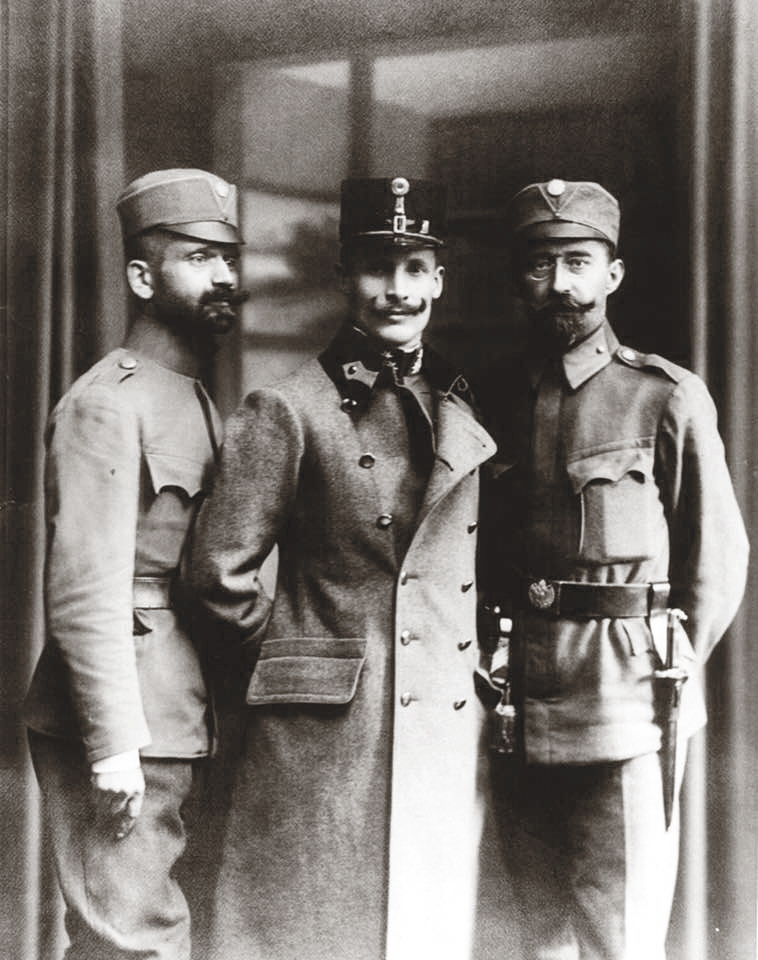
Dmytro Vitovsky (middle) proclaims Lemberg the capital of West Ukrainian People's Republic, but ethnic Polish resist and ignite the Polish–Ukrainian War.

Austro-Hungarian battleship SMS Viribus Unitis sinks in the port of Pula, Croatia following sabotage.

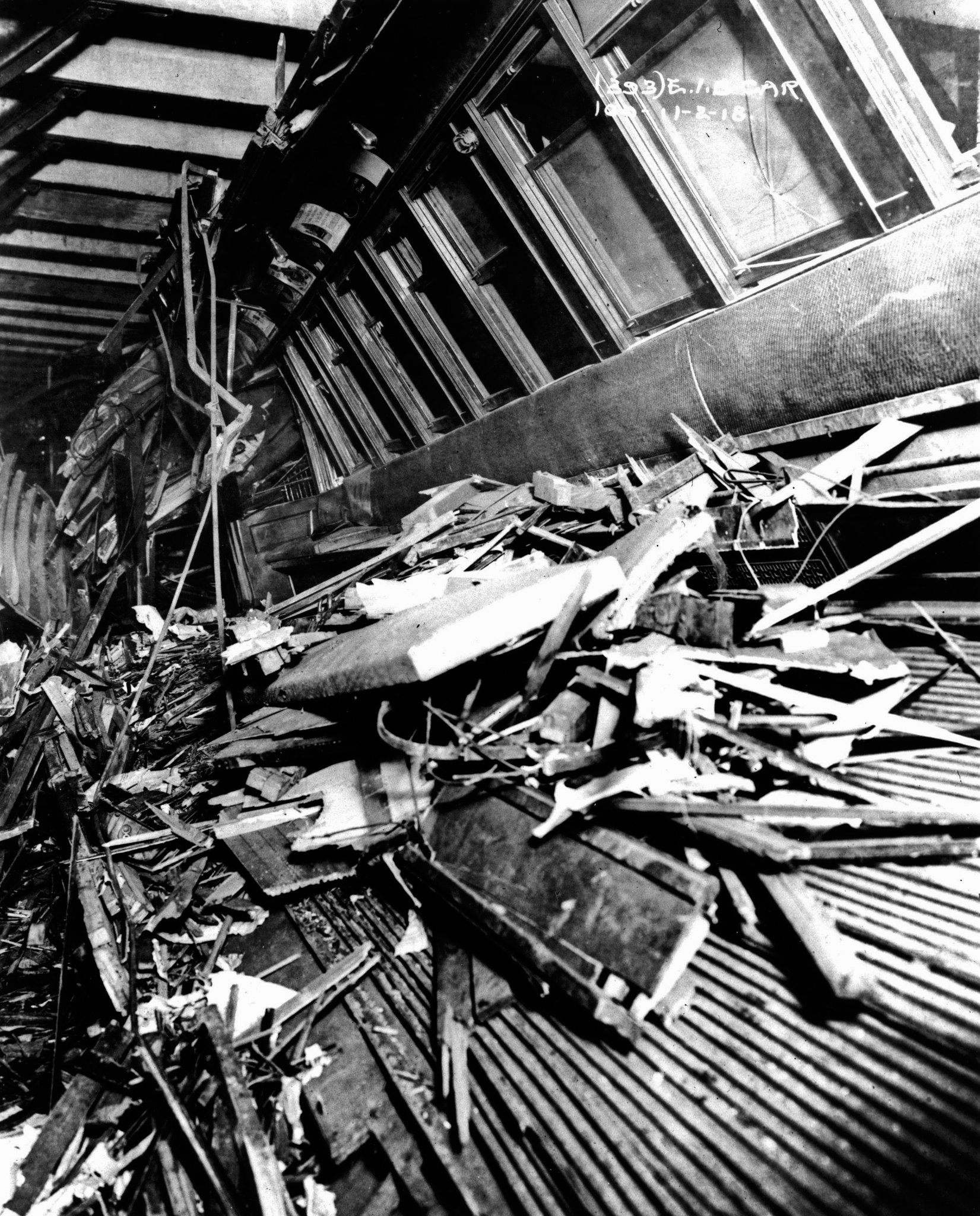
Wrecked subway car following train accident in Brooklyn, New York City.

- Liberation of Serbia, Albania and Montenegro – The Serbian First Army under command of Petar Bojović liberated Belgrade from the control of the Central Powers.
- Following the establishment of the West Ukrainian People's Republic in Galicia with the capital at Lemberg, ethnic Polish residents opposed to the creation of the republic began an uprising in the city known as the Battle of Lemberg, igniting the Polish–Ukrainian War.
- Meuse–Argonne offensive – The final major offensive for the Americans and French against the Germans in France yielded the capture of Buzancy near the Aisne River and Le Chesne near the Ardennes Forest.
- The Italian Navy attacked Austro-Hungarian ships anchored in the port of Pula, Croatia in the last major engagement the fleet committed in World War I. During the attack, the Austro-Hungarian battleship SMS Viribus Unitis was destroyed by Italian saboteurs, killing between 300 and 400 crew including Admiral Janko Vuković.
- The Banat Republic was established around the city of Timișoara within the dissolving Austria-Hungary (now Romania).
- The worst rapid transit accident in world history occurred under the intersection of Malbone Street and Flatbush Avenue, in Brooklyn, New York City, with at least 93 dead and over 100 passengers injured.
- The National Conservative Party won the most seats in the parliamentary elections in Cuba.
- French flying ace René Fonck scored his 75th and final aerial victory, ending the war as the highest-scoring Allied ace and second-highest scoring ace overall of World War I after German ace Manfred von Richthofen.
- German submarine SM U-72 was scuttled at Kotor, Montenegro.
- The French Navy expanded its French Naval Aviation arm to 37 airships, 1,264 airplanes, and over 11,000 men.
- The French West Africa School of Medicine was established in Dakar, French West Africa (now the National School of Medicine and Pharmacy in Senegal), with students selected for academic success in sciences from William Ponty secondary school.
- The Polish Scouting and Guiding Association was established.
- Born:
  - Werner Baake, German air force officer, commander of Nachtjagdgeschwader 1 for the Luftwaffe during World War II, recipient of the Knight's Cross of the Iron Cross; in Nordhausen, Germany (d. 1964)
  - Héctor Benítez, Venezuelan baseball player, center fielder for the Leones del Caracas from 1946 to 1954, two-time winner of the Baseball World Cup; in Caracas, Venezuela (d. 2011)

== November 2, 1918 (Saturday) ==
- Canadian and British forces captured Valenciennes, France in one of the last battles of World War I. Canadian non-commissioned officer Sergeant Hugh Cairns successfully led the capture of several German machine gun nests the previous day before he was critically wounded. He died from his wounds the same day the commune was liberated from the Germans, and was awarded the Victoria Cross posthumously. He was the last of 71 Canadians to receive the decoration.
- Battle of Przemyśl – Ukrainian and Polish soldiers clashed at Przemyśl in the former region of Galicia.
- U.S. Democrat Thomas Kilby was elected the 36th Governor of Alabama, defeating independent Dallas B Smith with 80 percent of the electorate in the Alabama state election.
- The Norwegian Mathematical Society was established with mathematician Carl Størmer as its first president.
- Born:
  - Raimon Panikkar, Spanish theologian, leading researcher on comparative religion; in Barcelona (d. 2010)
  - Alexander Vraciu, American air naval officer, commander of the VF-16 and VF-20 squadrons during World War II in the Pacific Theatre, three-time recipient of the Distinguished Flying Cross, Navy Cross, and four Air Medals; in East Chicago, Indiana (d. 2015)

== November 3, 1918 (Sunday) ==
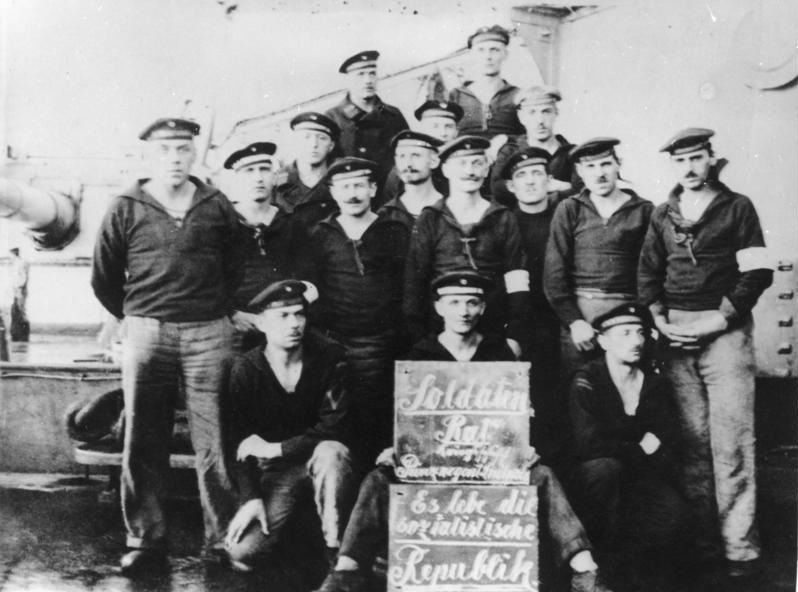
German sailors of Prinzregent Luitpold pose with a sign saying they are joining other ships in the Kiel mutiny.

- Austria-Hungary signed the Armistice of Villa Giusti with the Allies in Padua to end the war on the Italian Front.
- Liberation of Serbia, Albania and Montenegro – Allied forces reached Bosnia and stopped as the ceasefire with Austria-Hungary had been signed.
- Battle of Vittorio Veneto – The battle ended as soon as the armistice between the Allies and Austria-Hungary was signed. At that point, the Central Powers had suffered 30,000 killed and wounded with another 300,000 taken prisoner. Italy sustained 37,461 casualties, with most from the attempt to recapture Monte Grappa.
- Bombing campaigns between Italy and Austria-Hungary ended. Since 1915, Austria-Hungary had conducted 343 bombing raids on Italy, killing 984 people and injuring 1,193.
- Kiel mutiny – Thousands of supporters descended on the German port of Kiel to support a mutiny of sailors in the Imperial German Navy High Seas Fleet. A German force sent to quell the demonstration shot into the crowd, killing seven and wounding another 29 men. Although supporters withdrew, the act was considered the start of the German Revolution.
- Battle of Przemyśl – Ukrainian forces pushed Polish defenders into the western half of the city of Przemyśl, Galicia.
- The Imperial German Navy scuttled several destroyers including SMS V47 near Ghent, Belgium.
- The Provisional All-Russian Government was established in opposition to the Bolshevik government in Russia.
- The Communist Party of Austria was established.
- The Robespierre Monument was unveiled in Moscow to commemorate the first anniversary of the October Revolution. However, its shoddy concrete and steel wire design proved unstable and the statue collapsed four days later.
- Czech nationalists in Prague destroyed a Baroque Marian column that was built in 1650.
- The opera La nave by Italian composer Italo Montemezzi premiered at the La Scala in Milan.
- Born:
  - Bob Feller, American baseball player, pitcher for the Cleveland Indians from 1936 to 1956, including the 1948 World Series; in Van Meter, Iowa (d. 2010)
  - Elizabeth P. Hoisington, American army officer, first American woman to obtain the rank of brigadier general, commander of the Women's Army Corps, two-time recipient of the Legion of Merit and U.S. Army Distinguished Service Medal; in Newton, Kansas (d. 2007)
  - Russell B. Long, American politician, U.S. Senator from Louisiana from 1948 to 1987, chairman of the United States Senate Committee on Finance from 1966 to 1981; in Shreveport, Louisiana (d. 2003)
- Died: Aleksandr Lyapunov, 61, Russian physicist and mathematician, known for the development of the stability theory for dynamical systems in mathematics, brother to composer Sergei Lyapunov (b. 1857)

== November 4, 1918 (Monday) ==
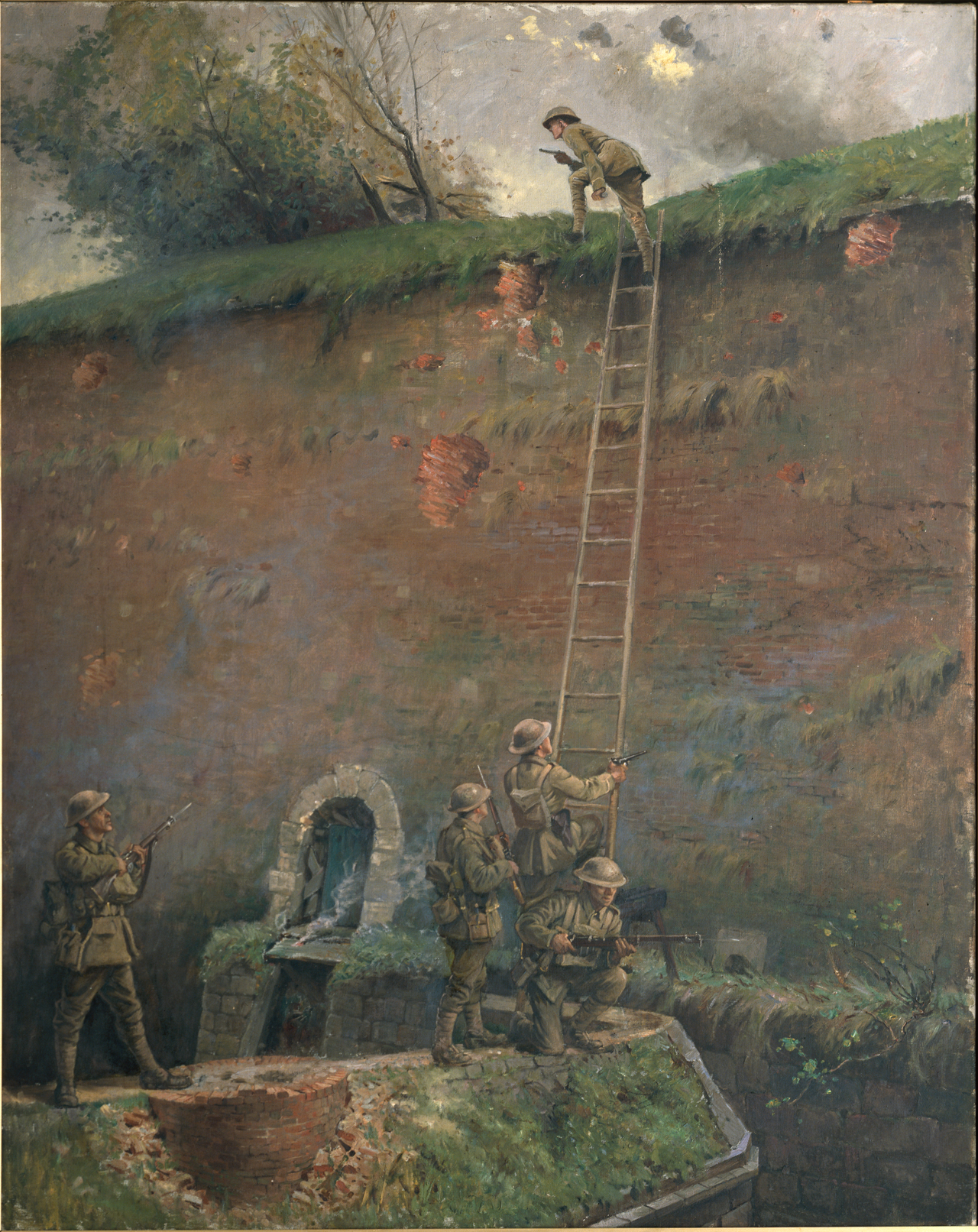
Painting by George Edmund Butler showing New Zealand troops scaling a wall of the Le Quesnoy fort during the Battle of the Sambre.

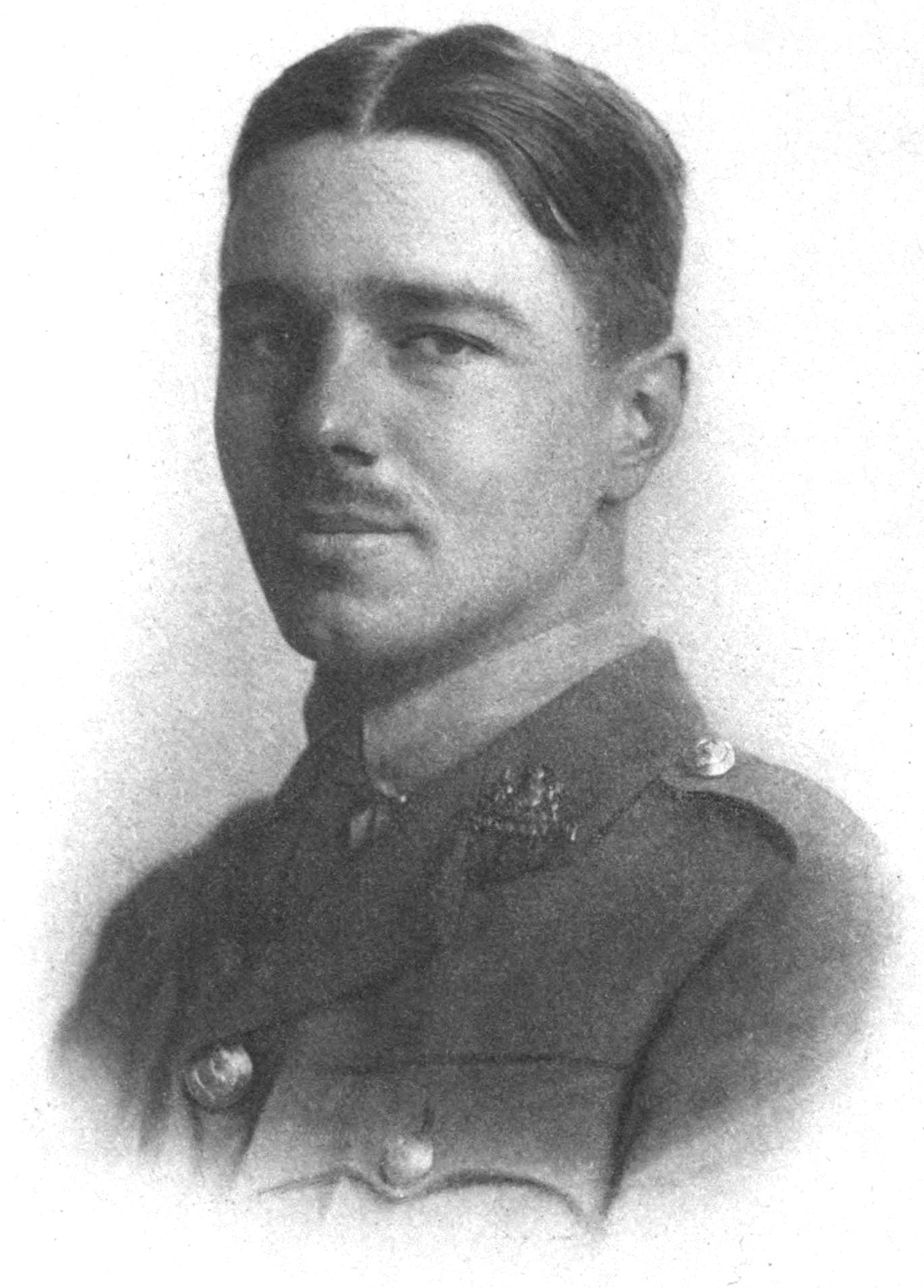
Poet Wilfred Owen, killed in battle

- Kiel mutiny – German militia were called to occupy the port of Kiel but many of the soldiers called in defected to the revolutionary side. By the end of the day, some 40,000 revolutionaries had occupied the port and released 14 demands to the German government.
- The Komancza Republic was established with the intention to unite with the West Ukrainian People's Republic. It was dissolved in less than three months into Poland.
- Liberation of Serbia, Albania and Montenegro – Austro-Hungarian forces withdrew from Cetinje, Montenegro, ending the Central Powers occupation of the country.
- Under the terms of the Armistice of Villa Giusti, the Allies occupied Tirol State, including Innsbruck, in Austria.
- Battle of the Sambre – British and French forces captured the Sambre–Oise Canal from the Germans, the last major battle of World War I. British war poet Wilfred Owen was killed during the battle, but news of his death only reached his parents in Shrewsbury a week later on Armistice Day. He was awarded the Military Cross posthumously a year later.
- The New Zealand Division captured Le Quesnoy, France, taking 2,000 German prisoners. Casualties for New Zealand were 122 killed and 375 wounded, while the Germans suffered 43 killed and 251 wounded.
- Forty German Fokker aircraft attacked nine Sopwith Camels with the No. 65 Squadron southeast of Ghent, Belgium. Aircraft with No. 204 Squadron joined the action, and the resulting massive dogfight ended with 22 German aircraft reported either shot down or last seen headed earthward out of control.
- Battle of Przemyśl – Ukrainian and Polish forces called for a temporary ceasefire in Przemyśl to allow the release of the Polish commanding officer and to exchange food supplies.
- The Ministry of Foreign Affairs was established for the government of Lithuania.
- Born:
  - Art Carney, American actor, best known for the role of Ed Norton in The Honeymooners, recipient of the Academy Award for Best Actor for Harry and Tonto; in Mount Vernon, New York (d. 2003)
  - Cameron Mitchell, American actor, best known for the lead role in 1960s television western The High Chaparral; in Dallastown, Pennsylvania (d. 1994)
- Died:
  - Thomas Baker, 21, Australian air force officer, commander of the No. 4 Squadron of the Australian Flying Corps, recipient of the Distinguished Flying Cross and Military Medal; killed in action (b. 1897)
  - Margaret Olivia Slocum Sage, 90, American socialite and philanthropist, wife to Russell Sage, founder of the Russell Sage Foundation and Russell Sage College (b. 1828)
  - Andrew Dickson White, 85, American academic and diplomat, co-founder and 1st president of Cornell University, 16th U.S. Ambassador to Germany (b. 1832)

== November 5, 1918 (Tuesday) ==
- The first Polish Soviet of Delegates, composed of over 100 workers' councils, met in Lublin, Poland to discuss establishing new sovereign Polish nations among the dissolving Austria-Hungary and Russian Empires.
- Several state elections were held in the United States, with results as follows:
  - Republican Thomas Edward Campbell elected as the second Governor of Arizona, defeating Democrat challenger Fred Colter by a mere 339 votes.
  - Republican William Stephens was elected as the 24th Governor of California, defeating independent Theodore Arlington Bell with 56 percent of the vote.
  - Republican incumbent Joseph A. A. Burnquist retained his seat as Governor of Minnesota with only 42 per cent of the vote, by splitting the vote between main opponent David H. Evans and others.
  - Republican incumbent James Withycombe retained his seat as Governor of Oregon against Democrat challenger Walter M. Pierce, but died in office five months later.
  - Republican William Cameron Sproul was elected 27th Governor of Pennsylvania with 61 percent of the vote.
  - Democrat Robert Archer Cooper was elected 93rd Governor of South Carolina, defeating main opponent John Gardiner Richards Jr. with 58 percent of the vote.
  - Republican Percival W. Clement was elected 57th Governor of Vermont with 67 percent of the vote.
- Former Cunard ocean liner HMS Campania sank in a violent squall off the coast of Scotland with no loss of life.
- Treutlen County, Georgia, named after American Revolution leader John A. Treutlen, was established with its seat in Soperton.
- Born: Gisela Arendt, German swimmer, silver and bronze medalist at the 1936 Summer Olympics; in Berlin (d. 1969)
- Died: Samuel Liddell MacGregor Mathers, 64, British occultist, co-founder of the Hermetic Order of the Golden Dawn (b. 1854)

== November 6, 1918 (Wednesday) ==
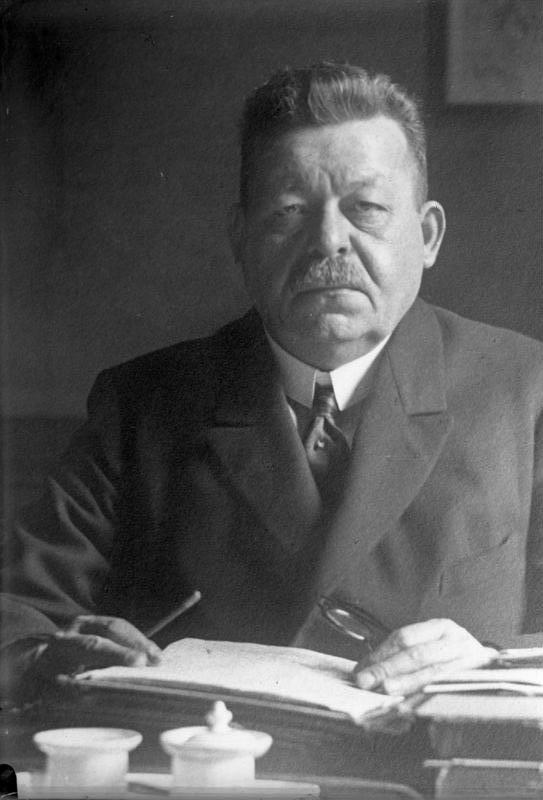
German Parliament leader Friedrich Ebert

- German Revolution – German Parliament leader Friedrich Ebert told Chancellor Max von Baden that "If the Kaiser does not abdicate, the social revolution is inevitable. But I do not want it, I even hate it like sin."
- The Polish Soviet of Delegates in Lublin, Poland established the Provisional People's Government of the Republic of Poland as the governing body of the newly independent nation, with Ignacy Daszyński as Prime Minister.
- A massive demonstration of 30,000 Polish peasants led by communist activist Tomasz Dąbal took control of the town of Tarnobrzeg, Galicia in the former Austro-Hungarian Kingdom of Galicia and Lodomeria and proclaimed the region as the Republic of Tarnobrzeg.
- Meuse–Argonne offensive – French and American forces captured Sedan and much of the surrounding German-held territory around the River Meuse .
- Died:
  - Alan Arnett McLeod, 19, Canadian fighter pilot, last Canadian air force officer to receive the Victoria Cross during World War I (b. 1899)
  - Jim Johnson, 31, American boxer, famously fought Jack Johnson for the 1913 world heavyweight title; died of influenza (b.1887)

== November 7, 1918 (Thursday) ==
- The Anglo-French Declaration was signed between the United Kingdom and France, agreeing to implement a "complete and final liberation" of countries that had been part of the Ottoman Empire.
- German Revolution – Revolutionary groups spread to other German cities including Hanover, Brunswick, Frankfurt, and Munich. King Ludwig of Bavaria fled with his family from Munich to the Anif Palace near Salzburg, becoming the first monarch of Germany to be deposed.
- The American Expeditionary Forces established the Third United States Army at Chaumont, France with Major-General Joseph T. Dickman given command on November 15.
- A Cossack regiment of 600 men known as Tchernetzov's Partisans, named after regiment leader Vasily Tchernetzov, were formed in Novocherkassk, Russia.
- The 1918 Liechtenstein putsch takes place; the government of Leopold Freiherr von Imhof was forced to resign and was replaced by the Provisional Executive Committee.
- Smolensk State University was established in Smolensk, Russia.
- The Czechoslovak War Cross was established to award for Czech soldiers performing acts of valor during World War I. It was also on occasion awarded to Allied officers, including General John J. Pershing of the American Expeditionary Forces.
- The Soviet Yiddish paper Oktyabr published its first edition in Smolensk, Russia.
- Born:
  - Paul Aussaresses, French army officer, commander of French forces during World War II, First Indochina War, and the Algerian War; in Saint-Paul-Cap-de-Joux, France (d. 2013)
  - Fred Cusick, American sports broadcaster, announcer for the Boston Bruins on WSBK-TV from 1971 to 1997, and NESN from 1984 to 1995; in Brighton, Massachusetts (d. 2009)
  - Billy Graham, American religious leader, founder of the Billy Graham Evangelistic Association, spiritual adviser to several U.S. Presidents including Dwight D. Eisenhower, Lyndon B. Johnson, and Richard Nixon; in Charlotte, North Carolina (d. 2018)

== November 8, 1918 (Friday) ==
- German Revolution – Pressure strengthened against Kaiser Wilhelm to abdicate the throne as the revolution continued to spread:
  - The People's State of Bavaria was established with Kurt Eisner as Minister-President.
  - Duke Ernest Augustus abdicated the throne of the Duchy of Brunswick.
- Polish war hero Józef Piłsudski and fellow colleague Colonel Kazimierz Sosnkowski were released from prison in Magdeburg, Germany after three months for leading a mutiny in July 1917 known as the Oath crisis.
- Born: Hermann Zapf, German graphic designer, creator of noted typefaces Palatino, Optima and Zapfino; in Nuremberg (d. 2015)

== November 9, 1918 (Saturday) ==
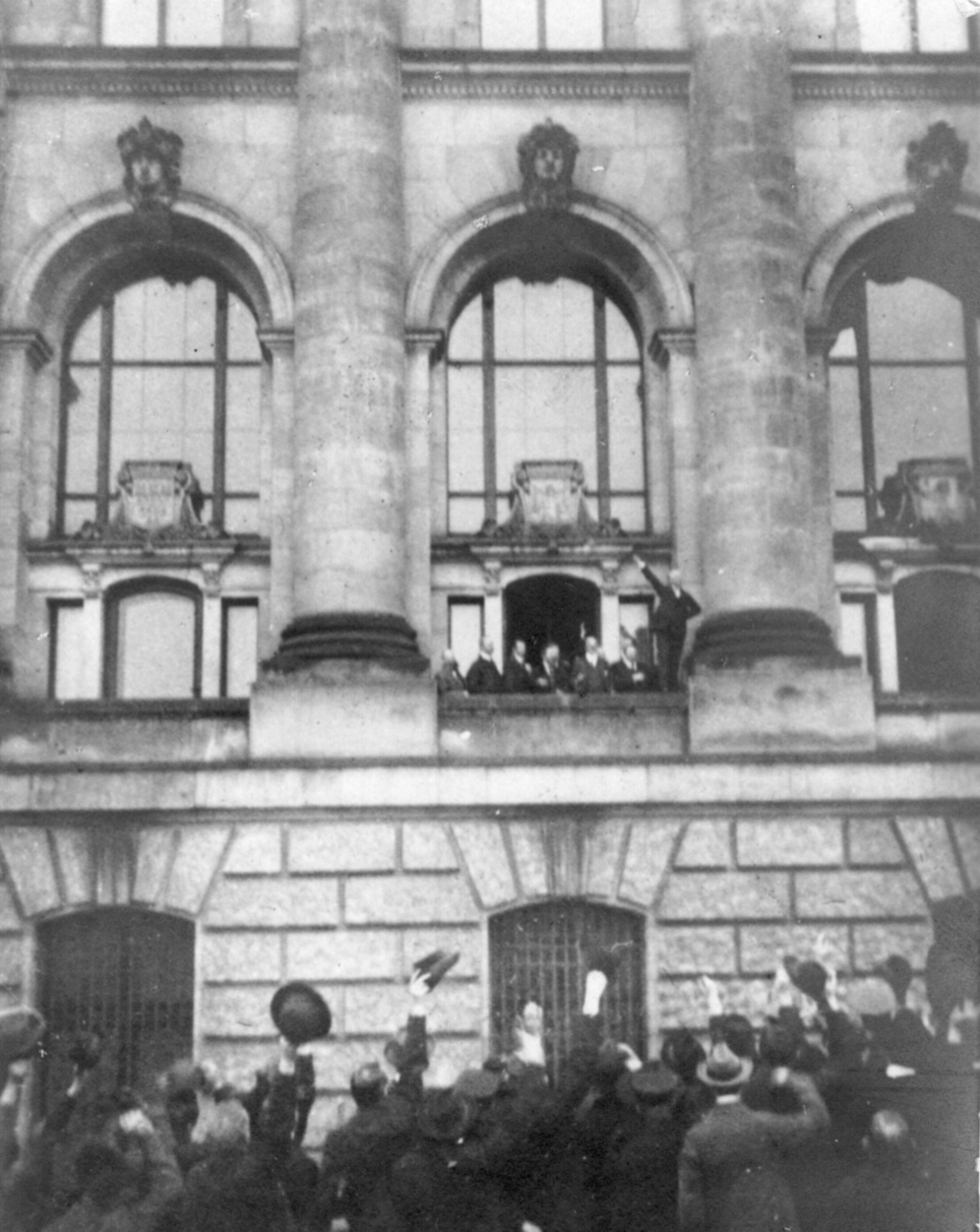
Crowds gather outside the Reichstag in Berlin to hear the German Empire was now a republic.

- German Revolution – The German Empire formally came to an end:
  - Kaiser Wilhelm handed supreme command of the army to Paul von Hindenburg and fled to the Netherlands the following day, ending 400 years of rule by the House of Hohenzollern over the Kingdom of Prussia.
  - Philipp Scheidemann of the Social Democratic Party of Germany proclaimed the establishment of the German Republic from the balcony of the Reichstag building in Berlin.
  - Prince Maximilian of Baden resigned as Chancellor of Germany and handed the office to Friedrich Ebert.
- Violent unrest between ethnic Italians and Croats broke out in Split, Dalmatia (now part of Croatia) after Italian flags were hung in house windows in honor of two French destroyers entering the port, giving the impression citizens were supporting Italy's bid for annexation.
- Luxembourg faced two small communist rebellions in Luxembourg City (10 November) and Esch-sur-Alzette (11 November). Both were quickly suppressed by police. Socialists and liberals in the Chamber of Deputies called for the abdication of Grand Duchess Marie Adelaide, which was narrowly defeated.
- Red Week – Dutch social activist Pieter Jelles Troelstra declared in Rotterdam that a socialist revolution, similar to the ones that brought down the Russian Empire and German Empire, was possible in the Netherlands. In response, the Dutch government armed police officers in Utrecht and in Amsterdam and secured the royal family.
- British battleship HMS Britannia was sunk by a German submarine off Cape Trafalgar, killing 50 sailors and injuring another 80 crew, in what was the last major naval engagement of World War I.
- Spartacus League members Karl Liebknecht and Rosa Luxemburg established the German political organization's own newspaper The Red Flag.
- The Argentine Central Railway in Colorado officially ceased operations.
- The last battle of WW1, the Battle of Vrigne-Meuse began.
- Born:
  - Spiro Agnew, American politician, 39th Vice President of the United States, 55th Governor of Maryland; in Baltimore (d. 1996)
  - Florence Chadwick, American swimmer, first woman to swim the English Channel both ways; in San Diego (d. 1995)
  - Thomas Ferebee, American air force officer, bombardier for the Enola Gay when it dropped the atomic bomb "Little Boy" on Hiroshima; in Mocksville, North Carolina (d. 2000)
  - Sverre Granlund, Norwegian soldier, member of the Norwegian Independent Company 1 during World War II, recipient of the War Cross, War Medal and Distinguished Conduct Medal; in Sauherad Municipality, Norway (d. 1943, killed in action)
- Died:
  - Guillaume Apollinaire, 38, French poet and playwright, known for works including The Breasts of Tiresias, The Cubist Painters, Aesthetic Meditations and Calligrammes; died of influenza (b. 1880)
  - Albert Ballin, 61, German shipping magnate, director of the Hamburg America Line which introduced the modern cruise ship (b. 1857)
  - Peter Lumsden, 89, British army officer, noted commander in the Indian Rebellion of 1857, Second Opium War, and Second Anglo-Afghan War, recipient of the Order of the Bath (b. 1829)
  - Robert J. Collier, 42, American publisher, editor of Collier's magazine, son of Peter Fenelon Collier; died of a heart attack (b. 1876)

== November 10, 1918 (Sunday) ==
- The Council of the People's Deputies was established as the new governing body of Germany, with goals to prepare an armistice with the Allies and prepare for the election of a new National Assembly the following year.
- Liberation of Serbia, Albania and Montenegro – Romania re-entered the war to retake territory lost to Bulgaria, while Allied forces entered Svishtov and Nikopol, Bulgaria.
- The Republic of Ostrów was established in the Polish area of Ostrów Wielkopolski.
- The Whites set up a counterrevolutionary government in northwest Russia.
- Battle of Przemyśl – Some 400 Polish reinforcements under command of Julian Stachiewicz arrived at Przemyśl.
- Royal Navy minesweeper HMS Ascot was torpedoed and sunk in the North Sea by German submarine SM UB-67 with the loss of 51 of her crew.
- Józef Piłsudski and Colonel Kazimierz Sosnkowski arrived in Warsaw at 7 a.m. where they were greeted at the rail station by Polish Regent Zdzisław Lubomirski.
- Born:
  - Ernst Otto Fischer, German chemist, recipient of the Nobel Prize in Chemistry for work in organometallic chemistry; in Solln, Germany (d. 2007)
  - John Henry Moss, American sports executive, key developer of Minor League Baseball; in Kings Mountain, North Carolina (d. 2009)
  - Yue-Kong Pao, Chinese business leader, founder of the World-Wide Shipping Group; in Zhenhai District, China (d. 1991)

== November 11, 1918 (Monday) ==
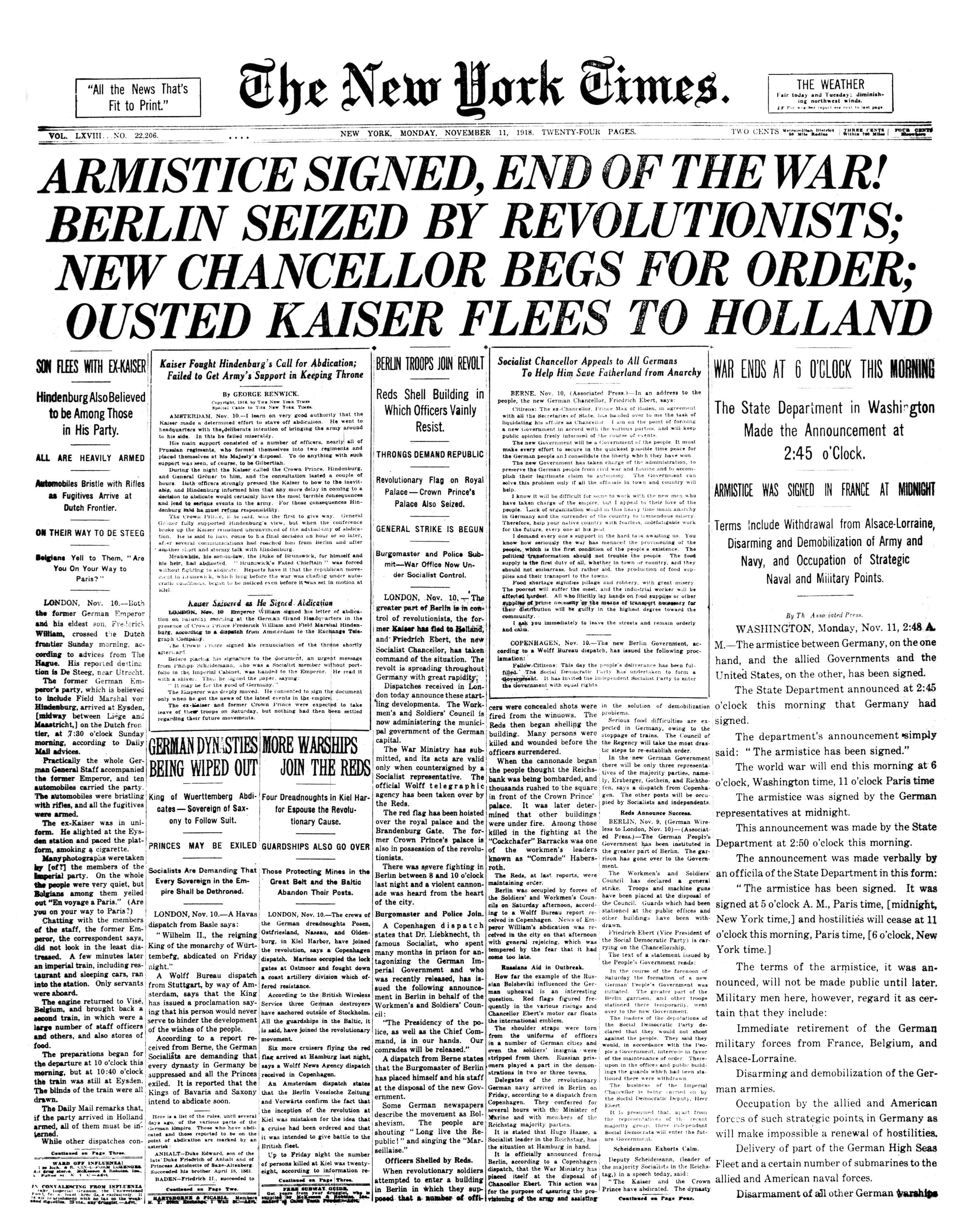
"Berlin seized by revolutionists": The New York Times on Armistice Day, 11 November 1918.

- Germany signed an armistice with the Allies between 5:12 AM and 5:20 AM in Field Marshal Ferdinand Foch's railroad car in Compiègne Forest, France. The end of World War I became official on the 11th hour of the 11th day of the 11th month. It was the largest war ever fought until World War II 21 years later, with 40 million recorded military and civilian casualties including 9 to 15 million combat deaths.
  - American soldier Henry Gunther was killed by machine gun fire at the French village of Chaumont-devant-Damvillers, France one minute before the armistice went into effect, one of the last known Allied soldiers killed in World War I.
  - Canadian soldier George Lawrence Price was killed by a sniper during a skirmish with a German unit at Ville-sur-Haine, Belgium. He was the last soldier of the British Empire to die in World War I, two minutes before the armistice was to go into effect.
  - French soldier Augustin Trébuchon was killed 15 minutes before the armistice, becoming the last French military casualty of the war. However, his death was recorded one day earlier as the French army was embarrassed to have soldiers engaged in combat on the day of the armistice.
  - British soldier George Edwin Ellison of the 5th Royal Irish Lancers was killed while on a patrol on the outskirts of Mons, Belgium, 90 minutes before the armistice came into effect. He was the last British soldier to die in World War I.
- Meuse–Argonne offensive – The armistice immediately suspended all fighting in the campaign. American and French casualties totaled 192,000, while German casualties were around 126,000. It had been the largest American operation of World War I, with 1.2 million soldiers committed to the offense.
- Poland regained independence after 123 years of partitions, with Józef Piłsudski appointed by the Regency Council as commander-in-chief. The date since then is celebrated as National Independence Day.
- Emperor Charles proclaimed he would give up absolute power in Austria, and again two days later for Hungary. However, he did not formally abdicate the throne in hopes the people of either country would vote to recall him.
- Red Week – A mix of Catholic, Protestant and moderate socialist organizations met in The Hague to organize a counter-campaign against the far-left socialist uprising in the Netherlands, calling themselves the "Orange Movement" (Oranjebeweging), after the Dutch royal family Orange-Nassau.
- The Liberal Party won the parliamentary election in Norway with 51 of the 123 seats in the Parliament of Norway after a second round of votes. Despite receiving the most votes, the Labour Party won just 18 seats, one less compared to the 1915 elections.
- Battle of Tulgas – A joint American, British and Canadian force of 600 men involved in the North Russia intervention clashed with a Red Army force of 2,500 soldiers at Tulgas, Russia.
- Battle of Przemyśl – Polish artillery shelled Ukrainian defenses in the eastern half of Przemyśl after an ultimatum to withdraw was rejected.
- A Jewish rally in Kielce, Poland ended in violence after rumors spread of anti-Polish sentiment and speeches were being expressed at the event. Soldiers entered the city theater where the event was being held after the meeting ended, rounding up 300 attendees who remained behind. After searching them for arms, the soldiers handed them over to an angry mob that beat them. Four members of the local Jewish community were killed and several Jewish business and homes were vandalized, but no charges were made against any of the participants.
- A communist revolution was attempted in the city of Esch-sur-Alzette in Luxembourg. It failed and was quickly suppressed with the help of local German forces.
- King Albert I met with a series of socialist and liberal politicians in the Loppem Agreements to discuss the post-war political order in Belgium.
- All military aircraft ended operations, with streamers attached to planes' wings to show no hostile intent. Of the states of the air forces of both the Allies and Central Powers at war's end:
  - Royal Flying Corps, Royal Naval Air Service, and Royal Air Force in total suffered 16,623 casualties. The RAF still remained the largest in the world with 20,000 aircraft and over 300,000 personnel, but in nine months the service was reduced to 35,000 personnel.
  - The Aéronautique Militaire of France finished the war with 3,222 aircraft for the front line. However, it had lost 8,500 pilots by war's end.
  - The Luftstreitkräfte had 2,709 aircraft by war's end but suffered in excess of 15,000 casualties.
  - The Italian Corpo Aeronautico Militare ("Military Aviation Corps") finished the war with a strength of 2,725 aircraft. During the war, 105 Italian factories manufactured airframes, aero engines, and aviation propellers, producing 11,986 airplanes, almost half under license and only 2,208 made entirely of Italian components.
  - The United States Marine Corps aviation force had grown from seven officers and 43 enlisted men during the United States entry into World War I to 282 officers and 2,180 enlisted men at the end of the war.
- The Finnish all-women paramilitary force during the Finnish Civil War was reorganized as Lotta Svärd, an all-women auxiliary force that grew to 60,000 members by 1930 and 240,000 members during the height of World War II.
- The Quaker Oil Products Corporation was established in Conshohocken, Pennsylvania as a manufacturer of lubricant products for the textile industry. It was renamed the Quaker Chemical Corporation in 1930.
- The Felixstowe Fury, the largest seaplane in the world and first to incorporate servo-assisted controls, made its first flight from the Seaplane Experimental Station in England.
- The first tractors by Renault were produced at a factory in Billancourt, France.
- The Strand Theatre, a movie house and vaudeville theater, opened to a double bill night in Dorchester, Massachusetts.
- Born: Georgie Abrams, American boxer, top contender for the World Middleweight Championship in the 1940s; in Roanoke, Virginia (d. 1994)

== November 12, 1918 (Tuesday) ==
- Austria became a republic with Karl Renner as chancellor.
- German Revolution – Members of the German royalty continued to abdicate:
  - King Ludwig issued the Anif declaration, which released all civil servants and military personnel loyal to the monarchy from their official oaths, ending the 738-year rule of the House of Wittelsbach in Bavaria.
  - Duke Bernhard, brother-in-law to Kaiser Wilhelm, was forced from the throne of the Saxe-Meiningen duchy. It became the Free State of Saxe-Meiningen until 1920 when it merged with the German state of Thuringia.
  - Duke Joachim Ernst abdicated the throne of the Duchy of Anhalt.
- Battle of Przemyśl – Ukrainian troops retreated from Przemyśl, allowing it to be fully under Polish control.
- Serbian forces entered the Banat Republic with support from Hungary and the Allies.
- Battle of Tulgas – Russian gun boats along the Northern Dvina River began shelling North Russia intervention forces at Tulgas, Russia while the Red Army tried unsuccessfully to take a strategic bridge over the river.
- Red Week – Dutch Prime Minister Charles Ruijs de Beerenbrouck announced that the daily bread ration would be increased from 200 grams (7.1 oz) to 280 grams (9.9 oz) provided the call to overthrow the government ceased. However, socialist leader Pieter Jelles Troelstra continued calls for a socialist revolution in the Netherlands.
- Voronezh State University was established in Voronezh, Russia.
- The Imperial Royal Austrian State Railways ceased operations.
- The U.S. Naval Torpedo Station was established in Alexandria, Virginia (now the location of the Torpedo Factory Art Center).
- The opera Phi-Phi by French composer Henri Christiné premiered at the Théâtre des Bouffes-Parisiens in Paris and became a popular post-war success.
- The Yugoslav krone replaced the Austro-Hungarian krone as the official currency of the Balkans.
- Died: Martín Teófilo Delgado, 60, Filipino army officer and politician, commander of Filipino insurgent forces during the Philippine Revolution and the Philippine–American War, first governor of Iloilo, Philippines (b. 1858)

== November 13, 1918 (Wednesday) ==
- Germany and Russia annulled the Treaty of Brest-Litovsk following the signing of the armistice.
- The Allies occupied Constantinople.
- The Romanian Army began to advance into Transylvania as the Central Powers withdrew, starting with the commune of Palanca, Bacău.
- German Revolution – Members of the German royalty continued to abdicate:
  - Grand Duke Frederick abdicated the throne of the Grand Duchy of Baden.
  - King Frederick Augustus abdicated the throne of the Kingdom of Saxony.
  - Troops in German East Africa, unaware that Germany had signed an armistice with the Allies two days earlier, entered and occupied the abandoned British colonial capital of Kasama in Northern Rhodesia (now Zambia).
- Red Week – The "Orange Movement" proclaimed supporters of the socialist revolution were in the minority and further attempts at revolution did not come about, ending the campaign.
- Born: George Grant, Canadian philosopher, noted thinker of Canadian politics including Canadian nationalism, author of Lament for a Nation; in Toronto (d. 1988)
- Died:
  - Alfred Hindmarsh, 58, Australian-New Zealand politician, first Leader of the New Zealand Labour Party (b. 1860)
  - Samuel F. Nixon, 70, American business entrepreneur, founder of the Theatrical Syndicate (b. 1848)
  - R. Bruce Ricketts, 79, American army officer, commander of the artillery barrage at Cemetery Hill during the Battle of Gettysburg (b. 1839)

== November 14, 1918 (Thursday) ==
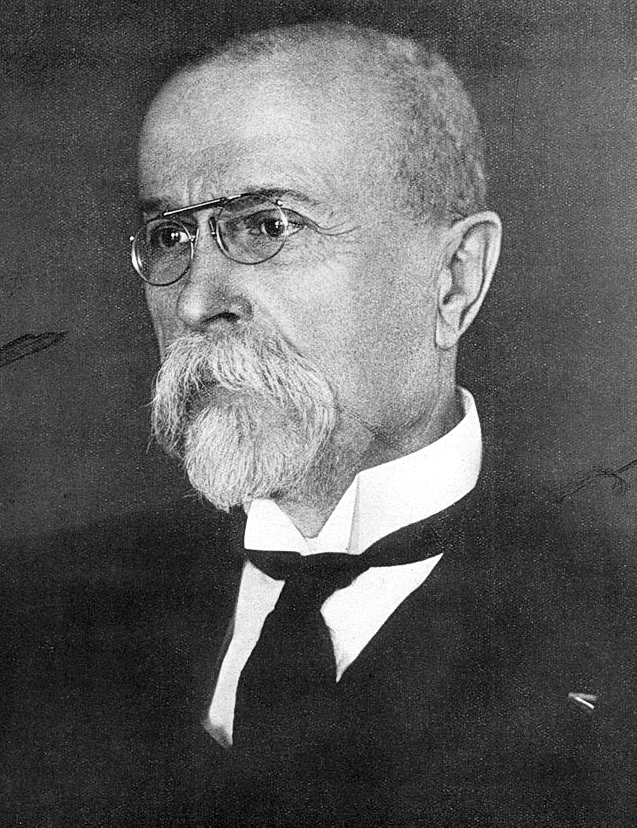
Tomáš Masaryk, first president of Czechoslovakia

- Czechoslovakia officially became an independent nation with Tomáš Masaryk as the country's first president.
- The British coalition government under Prime Minister David Lloyd George was dissolved. With coalition members from the Labour Party leaving, a general election in December was called.
- Józef Piłsudski was appointed Chief of State for newly independent Poland.
- German Revolution – Members of the German royalty continued to abdicate:
  - The provisional government of Baden proclaimed the former monarchy a republic.
  - Grand Duke Ernest Louis was forced from the throne of the Grand Duchy of Hesse.
  - Grand Duke Frederick Francis abdicated the throne of the Grand Duchy of Mecklenburg-Strelitz.
  - Duke Charles Edward, announced that he had "ceased to rule" the throne of Saxe-Coburg and Gotha as opposed to formally abdicating it.
  - Troops in German East Africa were informed of the armistice.
- Battle of Tulgas – American forces led by John Cudahy staged a counterattack against the Red Army and forced them to retreat. In all, the Red Army had 500 casualties and 30 prisoners, while the Allied forces suffered 30 killed and 100 wounded in the battle.
- Royal Navy cruiser HMS Cochrane ran aground in the River Mersey, England and later broke in two. The wreck was recovered and scrapped the following year.
- The Vitebsk Museum of Modern Art opened in Vitebsk, Belarus.
- Roosevelt High School opened in The Bronx, New York City in recognition of the Roosevelt family. It was renamed Theodore Roosevelt High School after the former U.S. president died on January 6, 1919.
- Born: John Bromwich, Australian tennis player, two time singles champion of the Australian Open, triple crown winner in doubles and mixed doubles for the Australian Open, Wimbledon and US Open; in Sydney (d. 1999)
- Died: Robert Anderson Van Wyck, 69, American politician, 91st Mayor of New York City (b. 1849)

== November 15, 1918 (Friday) ==
John Lavery's painting of the German naval delegates arriving on HMS Queen Elizabeth to discuss surrender to the Royal Navy.

- Rear Admiral Hugo Meurer, representing Admiral Franz von Hipper of the Imperial German Navy High Seas Fleet, met British Admiral David Beatty aboard HMS Queen Elizabeth to work out the terms for surrender of the German naval fleet to the Royal Navy.
- German Revolution – Prince Adolf abdicated the throne of the Principality of Schaumburg-Lippe.
- Brazilian president-elect Rodrigues Alves, suffering from influenza, was unable to take office on the scheduled date, and was replaced by Vice President Delfim Moreira.
- Serbian forces entered the city of Timișoara to suppress the Banat Republic on endorsements by the Allies.
- Surviving United States Army Air Service pilots serving with bomber squadrons of the Corpo Aeronautico Militare on the Italian Front assembled at San Pelagio Airfield outside Padua, Italy to receive the Italian War Merit Cross. About 100 American pilots served with the Italians, accumulating more than 500 combat hours using Caproni bombers while taking part in 65 bombing missions.
- The United States Army Air Service established the 5th Pursuit Group but with the end of World War I, the air group was disbanded the following year.
- The Soviet Red Army established the 16th Army.
- The Estonian national railway company was established.
- Rosa Ponselle made her Metropolitan Opera début as Leonora in Giuseppe Verdi's La forza del destino, opposite Enrico Caruso.
- Died:
  - Robert Anderson, 77, British law enforcer, Assistant Commissioner of Police of the Metropolis in London from 1888 to 1901 (b. 1841)
  - Nelly Erichsen, 55, English illustrator, best known for her collaborations with travel writer Janet Ross; died of influenza (b. 1862)

== November 16, 1918 (Saturday) ==
- The Hungarian Democratic Republic was declared, marking Hungary's independence from Austria.
- Political leaders against the Bolsheviks gathered for the Jassy Conference in Iași, Romania.
- Italian Navy cruiser Cesare Rossarol struck a mine and sank in the Adriatic Sea, killed 93 crew members.
- The First Division of Estonia was established to defend the country against the Red Army.
- Lithuania established its own postal service.
- American socialist leader Louis C. Fraina began publishing the radical newspaper The Revolutionary Age in Boston.
- Born:
  - Carter Manny, American architect, designer of the O'Hare International Airport in Chicago, the J. Edgar Hoover Building for the FBI in Washington, D.C., and the First Chicago Bank building; in Michigan City, Indiana (d. 2017)
  - Nicholas Moore, English poet, member of the New Apocalyptics group in London; in Cambridge (d. 1986)

== November 17, 1918 (Sunday) ==
- The Red Army launched a massive advance against the independent Baltic states, Belarus, and Ukraine.
- Serbian forces occupied the capital city of Timișoara of the Banat Republic.
- The Communist Party of Greece was established.
- The Haugesund Naval Air Station was established near Haugesund, Norway.
- The Tallinn Higher Music School was established, the precursor to the Estonian Academy of Music and Theatre.
- The fantasy adventure film The Ghost of Slumber Mountain showcased some of the earliest stop motion animation by special effects pioneer Willis H. O'Brien who refined the technique for the 1925 film The Lost World. The original cut was 40 minutes long but only a 19 minute cut of the film survives.
- Died: Andrew H. Burke, 68, American politician, second Governor of North Dakota (b. 1850)

== November 18, 1918 (Monday) ==
- The People's Council declared Latvia independent from Russia.
- German submarine SM U-165 sank in the Weser River in northern Germany but was raised and scrapped the following year.
- The football Club Atlético Douglas Haig was established in Pergamino, Brazil, in honor of British Field Marshal Sir Douglas Haig.
- Born:
  - Willie McKnight, Canadian air force officer, member of the No. 242 Squadron during the Battle of France and Battle of Britain in World War II, recipient of the Distinguished Flying Cross; in Edmonton (d. 1941, killed in action)
  - Tasker Watkins, Welsh judge, Lord Justice of Appeal from 1980 to 1993, recipient of the Victoria Cross for action during the Normandy landings during World War II; in Nelson, Caerphilly, Wales (d. 2007)
- Died: David Buick, 70, New Zealand politician, member of the New Zealand Parliament for Palmerston from 1908 to 1918 (b. 1848)

== November 19, 1918 (Tuesday) ==
- An Italian royal decree was issued that abolished the criminalization of acts of defeatism
- Belgian daily newspaper L'Avenir published its first edition in Namur, Belgium as a replacement for the defunct Catholic daily L'Ami de l'Ordre, which published its last issue the previous day.
- The Marinens floatplane was first flown in Norway.
- The women's fraternity Phi Theta Kappa was established at Stephens College in Columbia, Missouri. It currently has over 2 million members at 1,250 chapters in 10 countries.
- Born:
  - Brendan Corish, Irish politician, cabinet minister for the 13th and 15th Government of Ireland; in Wexford, Ireland (d. 1990)
  - Debiprasad Chattopadhyaya, Indian philosopher, leading proponent of Charvaka, recipient of the Padma Bhushan; in Calcutta, British India (d. 1993)
- Died:
  - Joseph F. Smith, 80, American religious leader, 6th President of the Church of Jesus Christ of Latter-day Saints (b. 1838)
  - Charles R. Van Hise, 61, American academic, president of the University of Wisconsin from 1903 to 1918 (b. 1857)

== November 20, 1918 (Wednesday) ==
- Elections were held for the new National Assembly created to unify Romania and Transylvania into one country. In all, 680 out of 1,228 seats were contested over a 12-day campaign.
- Serbian forces occupied much of the Banat Republic in an attempt to secure as much of the region as possible before the forthcoming peace talks in Paris.
- German U-boats started to rendezvous off Harwich, England under the supervision of Rear Admiral Reginald Tyrwhitt of the Royal Navy Harwich Force.
- Swedish steam ship Per Brahe sank during a storm in Lake Vättern, Sweden, killing all 24 passengers on-board including famed folklore illustrator John Bauer, his wife and fellow artist Ester Ellqvist, and their three-year-old son.
- The Government of Canada took over control of the Canadian Northern Railway, appointing a new board of directors and placing the management of the Canadian Government Railways under the new board's control.
- The Latvian Red Cross was established in Riga.
- The American Expeditionary Forces opened a military hospital in Rimaucourt, France, with Hospital No. 238 treating wounded American soldiers even though the armistice had ended fighting nine days earlier.
- Born:
  - Corita Kent, American artist, best known for the silkscreen work including the Rainbow Swash in Boston; in Fort Dodge, Iowa (d. 1986)
  - Naomi Frankel, German-Israeli writer, best known for the Saul and Joanna trilogy; in Berlin (d. 2009)

== November 21, 1918 (Thursday) ==
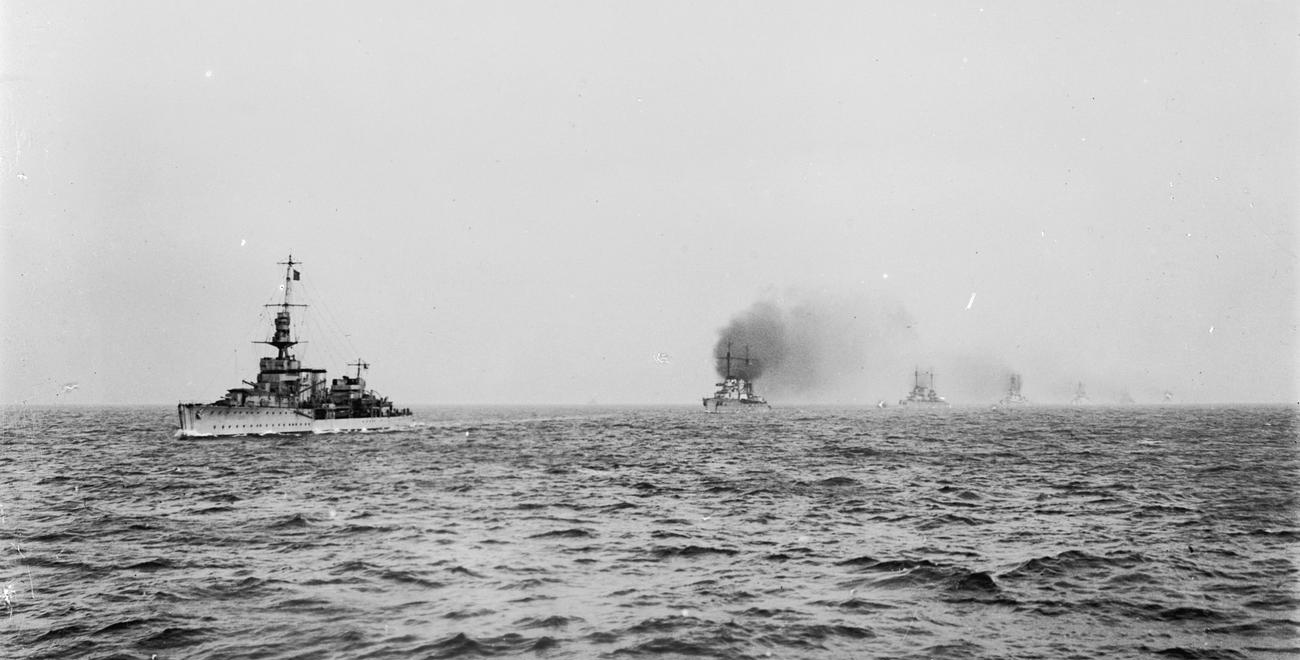
HMS Cardiff leading the surrendering Imperial German Navy into the Firth of Forth.

- Battle of Lemberg – Following the end of the battle, soldiers of the Second Polish Republic, along with mobs of vigilantes and freed criminals from local jails, began to loot and murder ethnic Jews in the city (now Lviv, Ukraine) on rumors of collaborating with the Central Powers in the closing weeks of World War I.
- The Qualification of Women Act received royal assent, giving British women over the age of 21 the right to stand as a Member of Parliament.
- Rear Admiral Ludwig von Reuter led an escort of over 70 ships with the Imperial German Navy High Seas Fleet under supervision of over 370 Allied ships from Harwich, England to Scapa Flow off the coast of Scotland.
- The Estonian Army began to organize an aviation and naval arm to their force, leading to the establishment of the Estonian Air Force and Estonian Navy. On the same day, Estonia debuted its own national flag.
- The National Institute of Public Health was established in Poland.
- Born:
  - Dorothy Maguire, American baseball player, catcher and outfielder for the All-American Girls Professional Baseball League from 1943 to 1949; in LaGrange, Ohio (d. 1981)
  - Sydney Dowse, British air force officer, member of the escape crew from German POW camp Stalag Luft III during World War II, recipient of the Military Cross; in Hammersmith, England (d. 2008)

== November 22, 1918 (Friday) ==
- The Belgian royal family returned to Brussels after the war, with King Albert having commanded the Allied army group in the autumn Courtrai offensive which liberated his country.
- Violence against Jews in the city of Lwów, Galicia intensified as some 500 businesses, homes, and synagogues were looted, vandalized and burned. Polish commanding officer Czesław Mączyński of the Second Polish Republic ordered martial law in the city by the end of the day, although many sources alleged he intentionally delayed it for a day while the violence happened.
- French forces occupied the former German-held region of Alsace–Lorraine.
- The German National People's Party was established.
- The American Japan Glass Sheet Company was established in Osaka.
- Born: Claiborne Pell, American politician, U.S. Senator from Rhode Island from 1961 to 1997, in New York City (d. 2009)
- Died:
  - Rose Cleveland, 72, American social leader, First Lady of the United States during the presidency of Grover Cleveland (b. 1846)
  - William D. Hoard, 82, American politician, 16th Governor of Wisconsin (b. 1836)

== November 23, 1918 (Saturday) ==
- German Revolution – Prince Günther Victor abdicated his throne of Schwarzburg-Sondershausen, the last of the German monarchs to abdicate. It become the Free State of Schwarzburg-Sondershausen until it merged with the German state of Thuringia in 1920.
- The British military governance of Palestine began.
- Violence ended in Lwów, Galicia with the arrest of over a thousand people involved in the rioting. Accounts following the violence were confusing, with estimated casualties ranging from 50 to 150 Jewish residents murdered and at least 443 more injured. As a result of the violence, the West Ukrainian People's Republic created a 1,000-man unit composed solely of Ukrainian Jews.
- The Wardman Park Inn, a 1,200-room hotel with 625 baths, opened in Washington, D.C. as the largest hotel in the city at the time.
- Died:
  - Harald Kidde, 40, Danish writer, author of Helten; died of influenza (b. 1878)
  - Michael Verdon, 79, English-New Zealand clergy, second bishop of Roman Catholic Diocese of Dunedin; died of bronchitis (b. 1838)
  - Fritz von Below, 65, German army officer, commander of German forces during the Second Battle of the Masurian Lakes, Battle of the Somme and Second Battle of the Aisne, recipient of Pour le Mérite (b. 1853)

== November 24, 1918 (Sunday) ==
- French minesweepers Inkerman and Cerisoles both disappeared while during a major storm on Lake Superior, with a total 78 crew lost.
- The Podgorica Assembly was established as the legislative governing body of the Kingdom of Montenegro with the goal to determine whether to join the Kingdom of Serbia, eventually leading to the creation of Yugoslavia.
- The Hungarian Communist Party was established by wartime partisan hero Béla Kun.
- The First Estonian Oil Shale Industry was established in Kohtla-Järve, Estonia, a predecessor to the Viru Keemia Grupp.
- The comic strip Gasoline Alley by Frank King first appeared in the Chicago Tribune, becoming the second longest-running comic strip after The Katzenjammer Kids.
- Died: Annie Hall Cudlip, 80, English writer, noted pioneer of the modern romance novel including Theo Leigh, A Passion in Tatters, He Cometh Not, She Said, and Allerton Towers, wife to theologian Pender Hodge Cudlip (b. 1838)

== November 25, 1918 (Monday) ==
- General Paul von Lettow-Vorbeck, commander of German forces in German East Africa, signed a ceasefire at Abercorn, Northern Rhodesia, the last German force to end hostilities in World War I.
- The Constitution of Uruguay of 1830 was replaced by a new constitution following a referendum.
- The Crimean Karaites overthrew the German-backed Crimean Regional Government and established the Crimean Frontier Government led by Solomon Krym. However, it fell to the Bolsheviks on April 2, 1919.

== November 26, 1918 (Tuesday) ==
- The Spanish flu pandemic ravaged Tonga, killing eight percent of the population, including the country's sitting monarch Queen Takipō.
- The Podgorica Assembly ('Great National Assembly of the Serb People in Montenegro') voted for a "union of the people" between the kingdoms of Montenegro and Serbia and for deposition of the exiled King Nicholas.
- The United States Marine Corps established the 15th Marine Regiment.
- The Soviet Red Army established the 18th Rifle Division.
- The Australian film The Sentimental Bloke, based on the popular poem The Songs of a Sentimental Bloke by C. J. Dennis, was first screened in Adelaide, Australia. Directed by Raymond Longford and starring Arthur Tauchert in the title role, it would take a full year before it would be widely released and become a major hit in Australia.
- Born:
  - Patricio Aylwin, Chilean state leader, 32nd President of Chile; in Viña del Mar, Chile (d. 2016)
  - Bill DeCorrevont, American football player, defensive back for Northwestern University from 1938 to 1942 and running back for the Washington Redskins, Detroit Lions, and Chicago Bears from 1945 to 1949; in Chicago (d. 1995)
  - Huber Matos, Cuban activist, member of the 26th of July Movement, opponent to Fidel Castro and political prisoner for 20 years; in Yara, Cuba (d. 2014)

== November 27, 1918 (Wednesday) ==
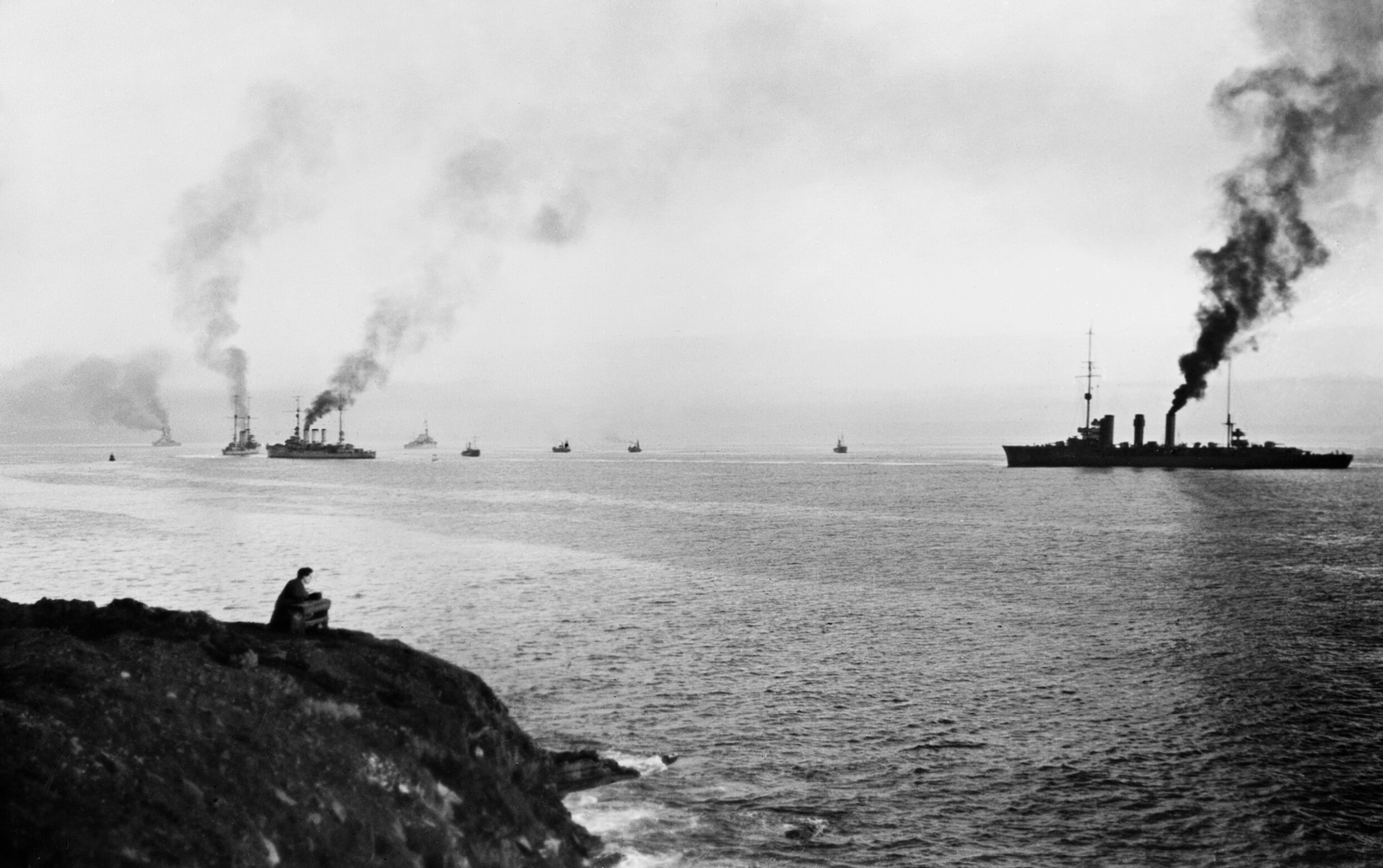
Emden, Frankfurt and Bremse entering Scapa Flow

- Most of the Imperial German Navy High Seas Fleet arrived at Scapa Flow off the coast of Scotland.
- The National Academy of Sciences of Ukraine was established.
- The Broadway musical Oh, My Dear!, by Guy Bolton and P. G. Wodehouse with music by Louis Hirsch received its premiere at the Princess Theatre in New York City for a run of 189 performances.
- Born: Royal N. Baker, American air force officer, commander of various squadrons during World War II, Korean War and Vietnam War, most notably the 4th Fighter-Interceptor Group during the Korean War, recipient of the Distinguished Service Cross, four Distinguished Flying Crosses, three Air Force Distinguished Service Medals, four Legion of Merits, the Silver Star, and 43 Air Medals; in Corsicana, Texas (d. 1976)

== November 28, 1918 (Thursday) ==
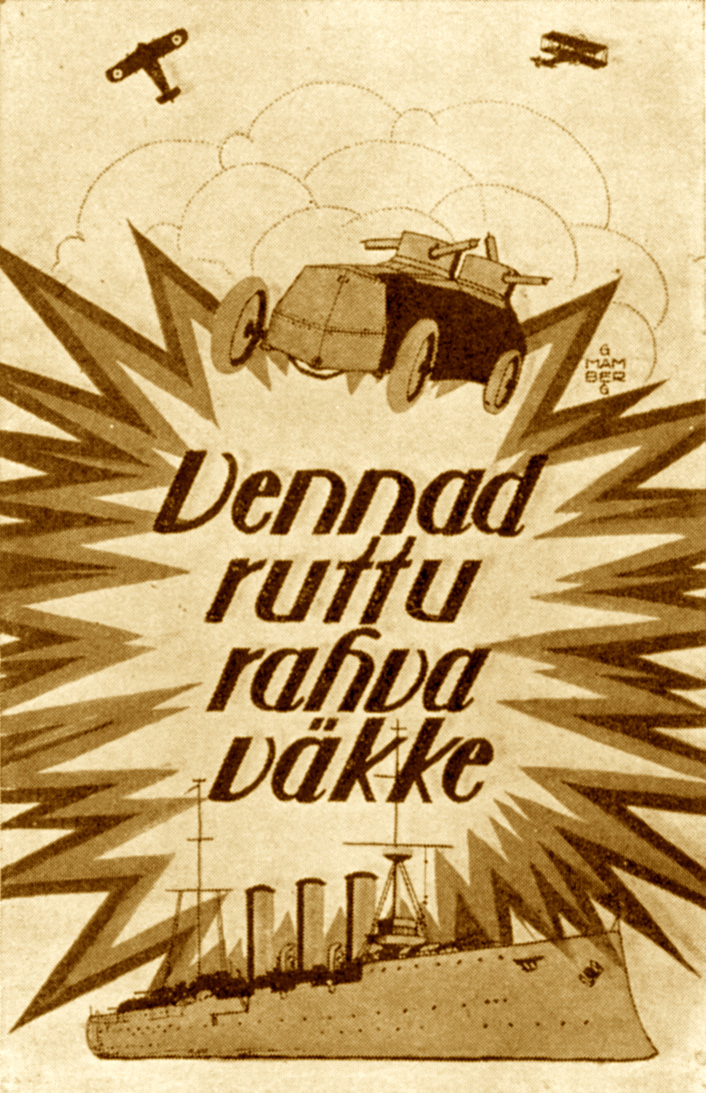
Estonian Army recruitment poster during the Estonian War of Independence.

- German Revolution – After settling in Amerongen, Netherlands, Kaiser Wilhelm formally abdicated the throne with the statement: "I herewith renounce for all time claims to the throne of Prussia and to the German Imperial throne connected therewith."
- Estonian War of Independence – Russia invaded Estonia when the 6th Rifle Division of the Red Army attacked the border town of Narva, occupying it the next day.
- The Kingdom of Montenegro was formally absorbed into the Kingdom of Serbia.
- The General Congress of Bukovina voted to dissolve the Duchy of Bukovina, formerly of Austria-Hungary, and unite with Romania.
- The Saint-Petersburg State University of Culture and Arts was established in Petrograd (now Saint Petersburg).
- The Central Railroad of Pennsylvania ceased operations.
- Born:
  - Jack H. Harris, American film producer, best known for B movies including The Blob, 4D Man, and Equinox; in Philadelphia (d. 2017)
  - Billy McLean, British special forces officer and politician, member of the Special Operations Executive during World War II, Member of Parliament for Inverness from 1954 to 1964, recipient of the Distinguished Service Order; in Sutherland, Scotland (d. 1986)
- Died: Margaret Cruickshank, 45, New Zealand physician, first woman to practice medicine in New Zealand; died of influenza (b. 1873)

== November 29, 1918 (Friday) ==
- Russian Civil War – The anti-Bolshevik Siberian Army under command of Anatoly Pepelyayev on the Northwest Front went up against the Red Army in what was the start of the Perm Operation.
- The Commune of the Working People of Estonia was established as a Soviet puppet state in Narva.
- The Association of Port Authorities was established in Norway, and operated until 1972 when it was replaced by Norwegian Association of Local and Regional Authorities.
- Born: Madeleine L'Engle, American young adult writer, author of the A Wrinkle in Time series; in New York City (d. 2007)

== November 30, 1918 (Saturday) ==
- The Act of Tilsit was signed which formally unified Lithuania proper and Lithuania Minor into one nation.
- German Revolution – King William abdicated the throne of the Kingdom of Württemberg.
- The All-Russian Central Executive Committee established the Council of Labor and Defense to manage Russia's economy and produce military material for the ongoing Russian Civil War.
- Ernest Ansermet conducted the first concert by the Orchestre de la Suisse Romande in Geneva.
- The Oslo Opera Comique held its opening performance, with Benno Singer as director.
- Born:
  - Efrem Zimbalist Jr., American actor, best known for television roles in 77 Sunset Strip, The FBI, as well as the voice of Alfred Pennyworth in Batman: The Animated Series; in New York City (d. 2014)
  - John Rosenberger, American comic book artist, best known for Girls' Romances, Superman's Girl Friend, Lois Lane and The Superman Family; in New York City (d. 1977)
- Died: Karl Jessen, 66, Russian naval officer, commander during the Russo-Japanese War (b. 1852)
