= Tulgas =

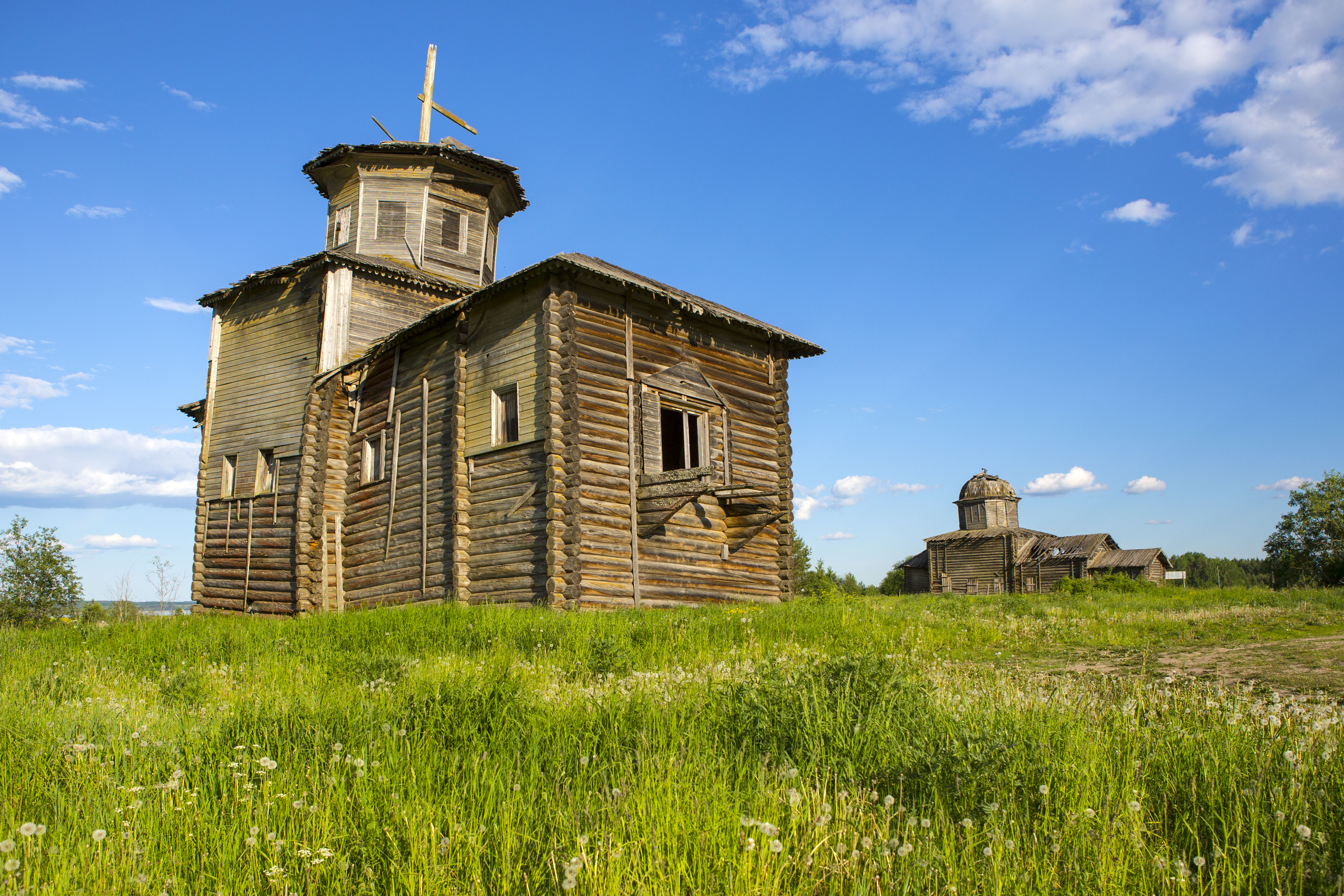

Tulgas is a traditional territory in Arkhangelsk Oblast, Russia, associated with the river Tulgas, a tributary of Northern Dvina.

== History ==
By the administrative division of the 17th century Russia, it defined the Tulgasskaya Volost of Podvinskaya Chetvert ("by-Dvina Quarter") of Vazhsky uyezd (Vaga Uyezd) of Pomorsky Krai (Pomorye). During the Soviet times, there was Tulgassky Selsoviet (until 1956).

The area is of historical interest due to the battles of the North Russia Campaign of the Allied intervention in the Russian Civil War. In fact, the collective term "Tulgas" for the area was introduced in books about the Russian Civil War in Northern Russia, published both in the Soviet Union and Russia, and in the West. In particular, the Battle of Tulgas is known.

== Populated places ==
The Tulgasskaya Volost had 10 villages: Нероновское, Булановское, Карповское, Сысоевское, Степановское (Стефановское), Труфановское, Масловское, Дмитриевское, Большое and Малое Коноваловское. By the 21st century of old names only the following names were preserved: Neronovskaya (Нероновская), Stepanovskaya (Степановская), Maslovskaya, Konovalovskaya.
