= Jærnet =

1918 novel by Danish author Harald Kidde

Jærnet (lit. 'The Iron') with the subtitle "Roman om Järnbäraland" (Novel about ironcarrier country) is a novel by Danish author Harald Kidde published in 1918. It is considered a pioneering work because the author—as one of the first writers to do so—uses a stream of consciousness technique similar to the one James Joyce used in Ulysses four years later. It takes place in three days around the Swedish town of Filipstad in Värmland, but has very little genuine action. Instead it is full of strong images and dreamy tales about religion, philosophy, erotic pleasures and history. It was intended as the first of a suite of four novels: The Iron, The Gold, The Fire and The Word, which together would tell the entire intellectual, physical, economic and spiritual history of Värmland, but 10 days after the publication of Jærnet the author died from the Spanish flu. Jærnet was translated into Swedish in 1921 with the title Järnbärarland.

== Literature ==
- Alfons Höger: Form und Gehalt der Romane und kleineren Erzählungen H. K.s, München (1969).
- Niels Jeppesen: Harald Kidde og hans Digtning.
- Ingeborg Kuke: Harald Kidde: Sein Leben und sein Werk, Jena (1942).
- Villy Sørensen: Digtere og Dæmoner. Fortolkninger og Vurderinger.
