= Maslovsky =

Maslovsky (Russian: Масловский; masculine), Maslovskaya (Масловская; feminine), or Maslovskoye (Масловское; neuter) is the name of several rural localities in Russia.

== Modern localities ==
- Maslovsky (rural locality), a settlement in Gololobovskoye Rural Settlement of Zaraysky District in Moscow Oblast; 54°47′N 39°05′E
- Maslovskoye, Nizhny Novgorod Oblast, a settlement in Natalyinsky Selsoviet under the administrative jurisdiction of the town of oblast significance of Navashino in Nizhny Novgorod Oblast; 55°32′N 42°22′E
- Maslovskoye, Novgorod Oblast, a selo in Poddorskoye Settlement of Poddorsky District in Novgorod Oblast
- Maslovskaya, Vilegodsky District, Arkhangelsk Oblast, a village in Nikolsky Selsoviet of Vilegodsky District in Arkhangelsk Oblast; 61°11′N 47°38′E
- Maslovskaya, Vinogradovsky District, Arkhangelsk Oblast, a village in Zaostrovsky Selsoviet of Vinogradovsky District in Arkhangelsk Oblast; 62°36′N 43°31′E
- Maslovskaya, Vologda Oblast, a village in Razinsky Selsoviet of Kharovsky District in Vologda Oblast

== Alternative names ==
- Maslovsky, alternative name of Novaya Maslovka, a selo in Chernyansky District of Belgorod Oblast; 50°53′N 37°56′E
- Maslovsky, alternative name of Maslovka, a selo in Prokhorovsky District of Belgorod Oblast; 51°05′N 37°07′E
- Maslovsky, alternative name of Maslovo, a settlement in Kochenyovsky District of Novosibirsk Oblast; 54°52′N 81°51′E
