= Astrid Ehrencron-Kidde =

Danish writer and translator

Astrid Margrethe Ehrencron-Kidde (born 4 January 1871 – 30 June 1960) was a Danish writer and translator.

The daughter of Vilhelm Christian Theodor Müller and Laura Marie Jacobsen, she was born Astrid Margrethe Ehrencron-Müller in Copenhagen. During her youth, she took piano lessons but an injury ended her dreams of becoming a concert pianist. She turned to writing and published a collection of stories Æventyr in 1901. She continued to write until 1939, publishing novels and children's literature. She then translated English and Swedish literature into Danish. In 1960, she published an autobiography Hvem kalder. Fra mine erindringers lønkammer.

In 1931, she was awarded the Tagea Brandt Rejselegat (Travel scholarship).

She married writer Harald Kidde in 1907; he died in 1918.

Ehrencron-Kidde died in Frederiksberg at the age of 89.

Her brother Holger Ehrencron-Müller was a Danish librarian.

== Selected works ==
- Lille Fru Elsebeth, novel (1904)
- Fru Hildes Hjem, novel (1907)
- Forældrene, novel (1909)
- Martin Willéns underlige Hændelser, 4 volumes (1911-1921)
