= Tulgas (river) =

Tulgas Russian: Тулгас

Location
- Country: Russia

Physical characteristics
- Mouth: Northern Dvina
  - location: 406 km upstream from the Dvina Bay
  - coordinates: 62.6014°N 43.4909°E
- Length: 29 km (18 mi)

Basin features
- Progression: Northern Dvina→ White Sea

Tulgas is a river in Arkhangelsk Oblast, Russia, a 29 km long left tributary of the Northern Dvina.

== Geography ==
The river starts in swampy highlands south of the settlement of Rochegda and flows through swampy and hilly taiga.

The river gave name to the area around it (Tulgas) and to some historical administrative subdivisions of Russia. The following villages are by the river: Maslovskaya (Масловская), Stepanovskaya (Степановская) and Nironovskaya (Нироновская).
