= Harald Kidde =

Danish writer

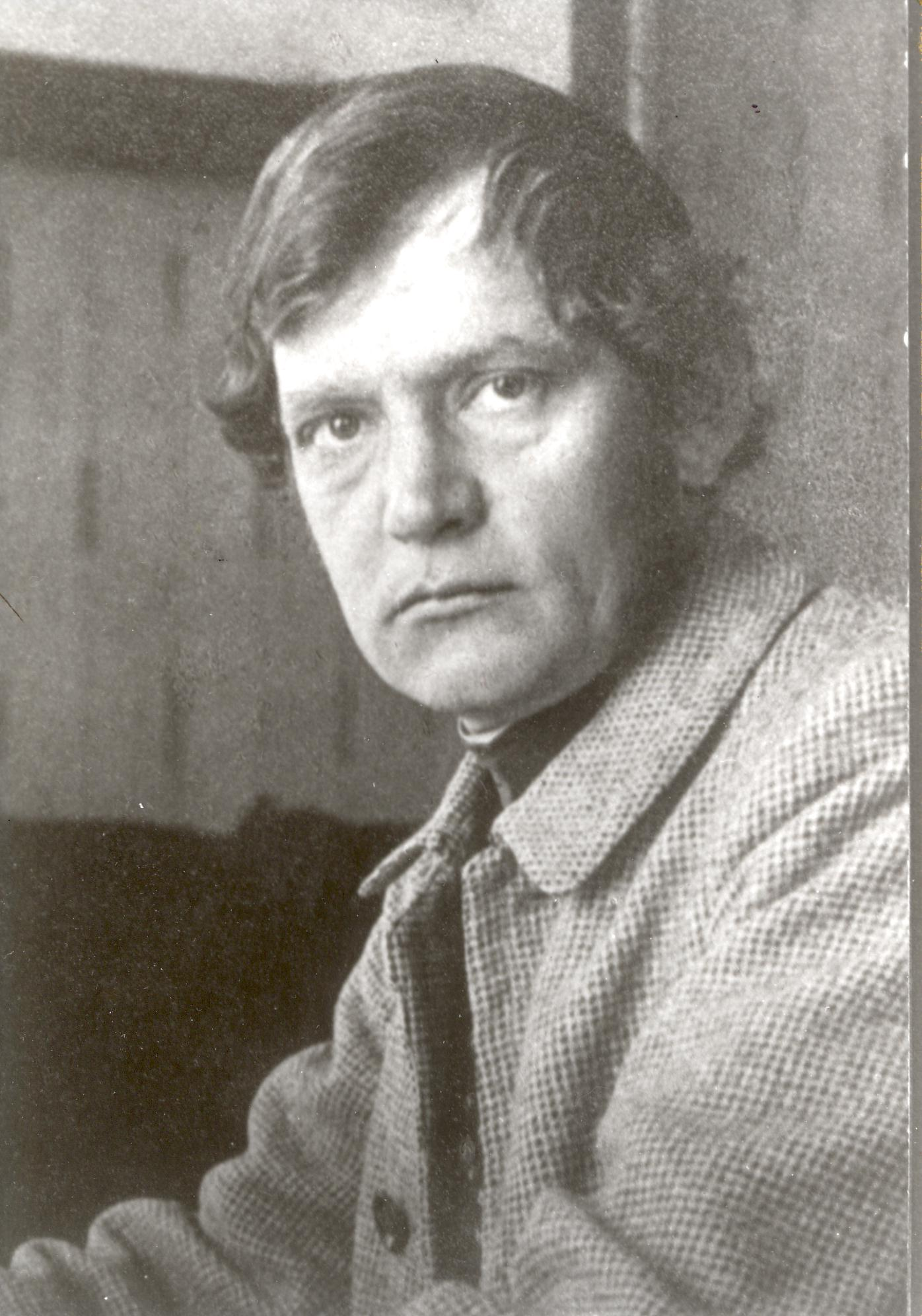
Harald Kidde.

Harald Henrik Sager Kidde (14 August 1878 in Vejle – 23 November 1918 in Copenhagen) was a Danish writer and brother of the politician Aage Kidde. He is best known for the novel Helten (The Hero), which is one of the key novels in Danish literature. Kidde died of Spanish flu in 1918. He was only 40 years old at the time. There is an extensive Kidde-archive at Vejle Town Archive.

== Background and education ==
Harald Kidde was born as the eldest son of road and waterways inspector in Vejle County Chresten Henriksen Kidde (1818–1894) and his wife Inger Dorothea "Doris" Cornelius (1848–1931). In his childhood he read the Danish author J. P. Jacobsen and German romantic poetry, which profoundly influenced his perspective on the world. He graduated from Vejle Højere Almenskole in 1898 and took the mandatory preliminary course in philosophy for entering the university in 1899 after which he began studying theology at the University of Copenhagen. But influenced by the Danish philosopher Søren Kierkegaard he could not come to terms with what he saw as the Lutheran church's thoroughly inadequate explanations of the inherent contradictions in the Bible. Even so, a self-sacrificing Christian life remained his ideal for the rest of his life.

== Debut ==
Soon his name popped up as the signature below articles and short stories in various magazines, and he debuted with Sindbilleder (images of the mind) a small collection of atmospheric images and parables in the late summer of 1900. Edvard Brandes, editor of the leading newspaper Politiken, called the book "a stylish debut". The young critic and poet Christian Rimestad admired the book and became a close friend of Harald, but far from all the critics understood him and many called his poetry sickly, effeminate and perverted.

== The novel Aage og Else ==
Two years later came the first volume of the novel Aage og Else with entitled "Døden" (death). The second part entitled "Livet" (Life) came in 1903. The action was based on Harald's own experience of the many deaths in his family during his childhood. Three siblings, his best friend and his father died. The protagonist Tue experiences a struggle in his mind between the ties to those who are not there anymore, and the ties to the love of his youth Lull, that tries to make him forget the death. The novel is full of many strong memories and beautiful descriptions of nature.

Christian Rimestad wrote about it: When Aage and Else was such an important work and at the same time one of emotionally richest and one of the most thoughtful of our novels, with elementary greatness and wondrous empathy, with which he explained the mood and emotions unconscious growth. Hardly ever before has a young man in Denmark raided his spiritual development with such a vigilant sagacity.

== Philosophy and poetry in Harald Kidde's books ==
Harald Kidde's blend of soul searching and poetry would be continued through all his upcoming books. With two-year intervals came from this time a number of works, all of which were large and heavy in mood and addressed big issues like life and death, growth and love. It was not books that were read by the masses, but it was books that were not forgotten by those who read them.

Danish author and philosopher Villy Sørensen writes in Digtere og Dæmoner (Poets an Demons): The lines are fragments of large thoughtful poems, and the books can best be regarded as philosophical treatises, in which the schematic beings stand as examples and types rather than individuals ..

His people were lonely, sensitive, sentient and painful souls. His thoughts were all about life's basic problems. He had a mysterious and almost ecstatic feeling of life and a justice-seeking idealism, a strong sense of responsibility and compassion for all those who suffered.

== Marriage to Astrid Ehrencron-Kidde ==
Harald met his future wife the writer Astrid Ehrencron-Müller (1871–1960) during a trip to Switzerland in 1904. Astrid had her literary debut with the fairy tale collection 'Æventyr' in 1901 and later became the author of more than 60 books, while Harald did not live to write more than 10.

== The novel Helten ==
In 1912 came Harald's best-known book, Helten. It was like all his previous books no success at first (it sold only 190 copies the first year), but then its audience grew slowly bigger and bigger. Today it has been reprinted several times and has been translated unto German, French, Norwegian and Vietnamese.

The Danish writer Tom Kristensen wrote about it: It is one of the masterpieces of twentieth century Danish literature. It should have gotten him worldwide fame, but earthly success was as little given to him as it was assigned to his hero, the schoolteacher Clemens Bek .

== The novel Jærnet ==
After Helten the literary world heard nothing from Harald in six years while he sat in a small cabin in the woods of Värmland together with Astrid and wrote on a gigantic work in four volumes about industrialism and the conditions of modern life: 'Jærnet' (the iron) 'Guldet' (the gold),'Ilden' (the fire) and 'Ordet' (the word). But he died a few days after the first book in the series was released.

Tom Kristensen wrote: Harald Kidde took his poetic vocation so serious that he worked himself to death. Of his great works about Värmland appeared only the ecstatic novel Jærnet. Had he completed the work, he might have been recognized by a world that filled with devotion would have fallen to his knees. Now it was only the small Danish community. They love this man, that steep and faithfully stood tall, portraying virtues that are about to go off course. An introvert in an extrovert time, a romantic in a realistic time, a religious skeptic in an equally skeptical irreligious time, a poet who has time to wait for the coming of a mankind that turns the gaze inward again.

Fellow Danish author Kai Hoffmann wrote of Jærnet: Perhaps never in history a writer sacrificed so immensely to work on a novel as Kidde sacrificed on this last book, 'Jærnet'. Its focused ecstasy got even hardened professors of literature, experienced readers and spruce blockers to gasp for air. 'Helten' is the monumental work in Kiddes production, but in 'Jærnet', which I confess I've never managed to read to the end, Harald was culminating, not as an artist, but through a performance that one might call a genial fiasco. Strength is weakness and weakness is strength. That has inspired this work of a late-born scion of a powerful tribe. Kidde, now in the home of the poets, was also backward in our present reality – a kind of ambassador from the dead. A solemn singer for all the lonely places and humble minds. When he put the pen away, he burst and died.

Christian Rimestad wrote: We, who knew Harald Kidde, was deeply astonished, that our friend in all the hours we did not see him, went about as far away from us as he could come, in regions where his character was cowarded and shaken into trances and pain. We could only begin to grasp the nature of it, because when we saw him, we always met the same comfortable face, there was nothing but kindness, gentleness and faithfulness. I remember the few times while he finished Jærnet, when his face was very pale; the mouth's lines when he was silent, was so pressed together as if they had locked themselves to a puzzle, and in his eyes were something troubled and suffering almost as if they had struggled too long to gaze into a secret world, that was closed to our eyes.

== Harald Kidde's death ==
Kidde's colleague and friend Carl Dumreicher wrote the following obituary in the newspaper 'København', when Harald Kidde died of the Spanish flu 23 November 1918: Harald Kidde is dead. The words goes right into the heart with an oppressive and paralyzing grip, just because he who fought honest, looking deeper, and aspiring higher than any other in the generation of Danish writers he belonged to; where the one we most reluctant of all could do without. He who for a long time was one to follow, more and more revealed himself as the future. He was both too young and too good for the early and unflattering death that has taken him away, just as he was approaching the height of his writings, and robbed Danish literature of one of its finest and purest personalities. So young he was, and so much he still had to give, he did not just leave the memory of a loveable personality full of gentle warmth and soulful earnest, but has inscribed his name in Danish literature with imperishable values and great weight.

Harald Kidde is buried at Bispebjerg Cemetery in Copenhagen.

== Bibliography ==
=== Novels ===
==== The Vejle novels (or Youth novels) ====
- Aage og Else, Vol. 1 Døden, 1902.
- Aage og Else, Vol. 2 Livet, 1902.
- De Blinde, 1906.
- Loven, 1908.
- Den Anden, 1909.
- De Salige, 1910.

==== Mature novels ====
- Helten, 1912.
- Jærnet, Roman om Järnbärerland, 1918.

=== Short stories, poetry, journalism and travel tales ===
==== Published in his own lifetime ====
- Sindbilleder, 1900.
- Mennesker, 1901.
- Tilskueren 1901, Harald Kidde, Menneskenes Søn.
- Luftslotte, 1904.
- Tilskueren 1904, Harald Kidde, Smertens Vej.
- Tilskueren 1905, Harald Kidde, Drømmerier.
- Aften 1908. (published in Stockholm as a special print of the Swedish magazine Ord och Bild)
- Mødet Nytårsnat, en Krønike fra Anholt, 1917.

==== Published after his death ====
- Vandringer, 1920.
- Dinkelsbühl, 1931.
- Under de Blomstrende Frugttræer, 1942.
- Parabler, 1948.
- Krageskrigene, 1953.
