= Helten =

Book by Harald Kidde

Helten (lit. 'The Hero') is a novel by the Danish author Harald Kidde (1878–1918) and is his most important work. It is also generally considered by experts to be among the most important works of 20th century Danish literature. The novel is translated into French, German, Norwegian and Vietnamese. The protagonist is the teacher Clemens Bek on the remote island of Anholt. He is a true Christian in a world of hypocrites—a hero of the faith.

== Literature ==
- Jens Marinus Jensen: Harald Kidde. Bidrag til hans Biografi (including: "Bidrag til en Kidde-Bibliografi") (1924), enhanced version (1948)
- Jacob Paludan: "Lysstraalen fra Anholt" in Litterært Selskab (1956)
- Villy Sørensen: "Erindringens digter. Harald Kidde" in Digtere og dæmoner (1959) p. 41–83
- Jørgen Egebak: "Studier i Harald Kiddes "Helten"" in Danske Studier (1966) p. 75-95
- Alfons Höger: "Helten". En tendensromans tilblivelse" in Danske Studier (1968) p. 63–74
- Otto Asmus Thomsen: "Helten og hans ø" i: Danske Studier (1970) pp. 112–123
- Christian Kock: "Meningen med Helten. En studie i symbolik" in Danske Studier (1976) pp. 49–75
- Niels Kofoed: Den nostalgiske dimension. En værkgennemgang af Harald Kiddes roman Helten (1980)
- Knud Bjarne Gjesing: "De nedrige steder. Harald Kidde. Helten" in Læsninger i Dansk Litteratur, vol. 3 (1997) pp. 146–163
- Henrik Schovsbo: "Helten" in Dansk forfatterleksikon (2001)
