= Konovalovskaya =

Konovalovskaya Коноваловская
- Village
- Location within Arkhangelsk Oblast Location within Russia
- Coordinates: 62°35′N 43°31′E
- Country: Russia
- Region: Arkhangelsk Oblast
- District: Vinogradovsky District
- Time zone: UTC+3:00

Konovalovskaya (Russian: Коноваловская) is a rural locality (a village) in Osinovskoye Rural Settlement of Vinogradovsky District, Arkhangelsk Oblast, Russia. The population was 3 as of 2010.

== Geography ==
Konovalovskaya is located on the Severnaya Dvina River, 64 km southeast of Bereznik (the district's administrative centre) by road. Maslovskaya is the nearest rural locality.
