= Henry Gunther =

American soldier killed last in WWI (1895–1918)

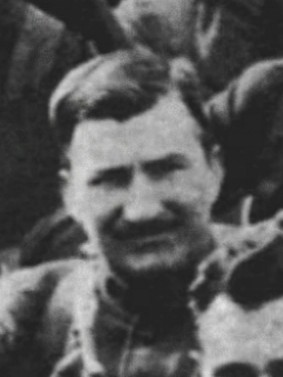
- Photo of Gunther while with his troops during WWI.
- Born: June 6, 1895; Baltimore, Maryland, U.S.
- Died: November 11, 1918 (aged 23); Chaumont-devant-Damvillers, Meuse, France
- Burial place: Most Holy Redeemer Cemetery, Baltimore
- Military career
- Allegiance: United States
- Branch: U.S. Army
- Service years: 1917–1918
- Rank: Sergeant
- Units: 313th Infantry Regiment, 79th Division
- Known for: The last soldier to die in World War I
- Conflicts: World War I; Meuse-Argonne Offensive †
- Awards: Distinguished Service Cross

Henry Nicholas John Gunther (June 6, 1895 – November 11, 1918) was an American soldier and possibly the last soldier of any of the belligerents to be killed during World War I. He was killed at 10:59 a.m., about one minute before the Armistice was to take effect at 11:00 a.m.

== Early life ==
Henry Gunther was born into a German-American family in east Baltimore, Maryland, on June 6, 1895. His parents, George Gunther (1869–1919) and Lina Roth (1866–1938), were both children of German immigrants. He grew up in Highlandtown, an East Baltimore neighborhood heavily influenced by German immigrants, where his family belonged to Sacred Heart of Jesus Roman Catholic parish. Gunther worked as a bookkeeper and clerk at the National Bank of Baltimore. He joined the Roman Catholic service order for laymen, the Knights of Columbus, in 1915.

== Military service ==
Being of recent German-American heritage, Gunther did not automatically enlist in the armed forces as many others did soon after the United States declared war on Germany in April 1917. In September 1917, he was drafted and assigned to the 313th Infantry Regiment, nicknamed "Baltimore's Own"; it was part of the larger 157th Brigade of the 79th Infantry Division.

Promoted as a supply sergeant, he was responsible for clothing in his military unit, and arrived in France in July 1918 as part of the incoming American Expeditionary Forces. A critical letter home, in which he reported on the "miserable conditions" at the front and advised a friend to try anything to avoid being drafted, was intercepted by the Army postal censor. As a result, he was demoted from sergeant to private.

Gunther's unit, Company "A", arrived at the Western Front on September 12, 1918. Like all Allied units on the front of the Meuse-Argonne Offensive, it was still embroiled in fighting on the morning of November 11. The armistice with Germany was signed by 5:00 a.m., local time, but it would not come into force until 11:00 a.m.

Gunther's squad approached a roadblock of two German machine guns in the village of Chaumont-devant-Damvillers near Meuse, in Lorraine. Gunther got up, against the orders of his close friend and sergeant Ernest Powell, and charged the position with a Browning automatic rifle. The German soldiers, already aware of the armistice that would take effect in one minute, tried to wave Gunther away. He kept coming, and fired "a shot or two". When he got too close to the machine guns, he was hit by a short burst of automatic fire, dying instantly.

The writer James M. Cain, then a reporter for The Baltimore Sun, interviewed Gunther's comrades afterward. He wrote that Gunther had "brooded a great deal over his recent reduction in rank, and became obsessed with a determination to make good before his officers and fellow soldiers".

American Expeditionary Forces commanding General John J. Pershing's "Order of The Day" on the following day specifically mentioned Gunther as the last American killed in the war. The Army posthumously restored his rank of sergeant, also awarding him a divisional citation for gallantry in action and the Distinguished Service Cross. Gunther's remains were returned to the United States in 1923 after being exhumed from a military cemetery in France, and buried at the Most Holy Redeemer Cemetery in Baltimore.

Subsequent investigations revealed that on the last day of World War I, during the armistice negotiations in the railroad cars encampment at the Compiegne Forest, French commander-in-chief Marshal Foch refused to accede to the German negotiators' request to declare an immediate ceasefire or truce so that there would be no more useless waste of lives among the common soldiers. The failure to declare a truce, even between the signing of the documents for the armistice and its entry into force "at the eleventh hour of the eleventh day of the eleventh month", caused about 11,000 additional men to be wounded or killed – far more than usual, according to the military statistics.

== Memorials ==
Several years after Gunther's death, a Veterans of Foreign Wars post in east Baltimore, number 1858, was named after him. The post honoring Gunther closed in 2004.

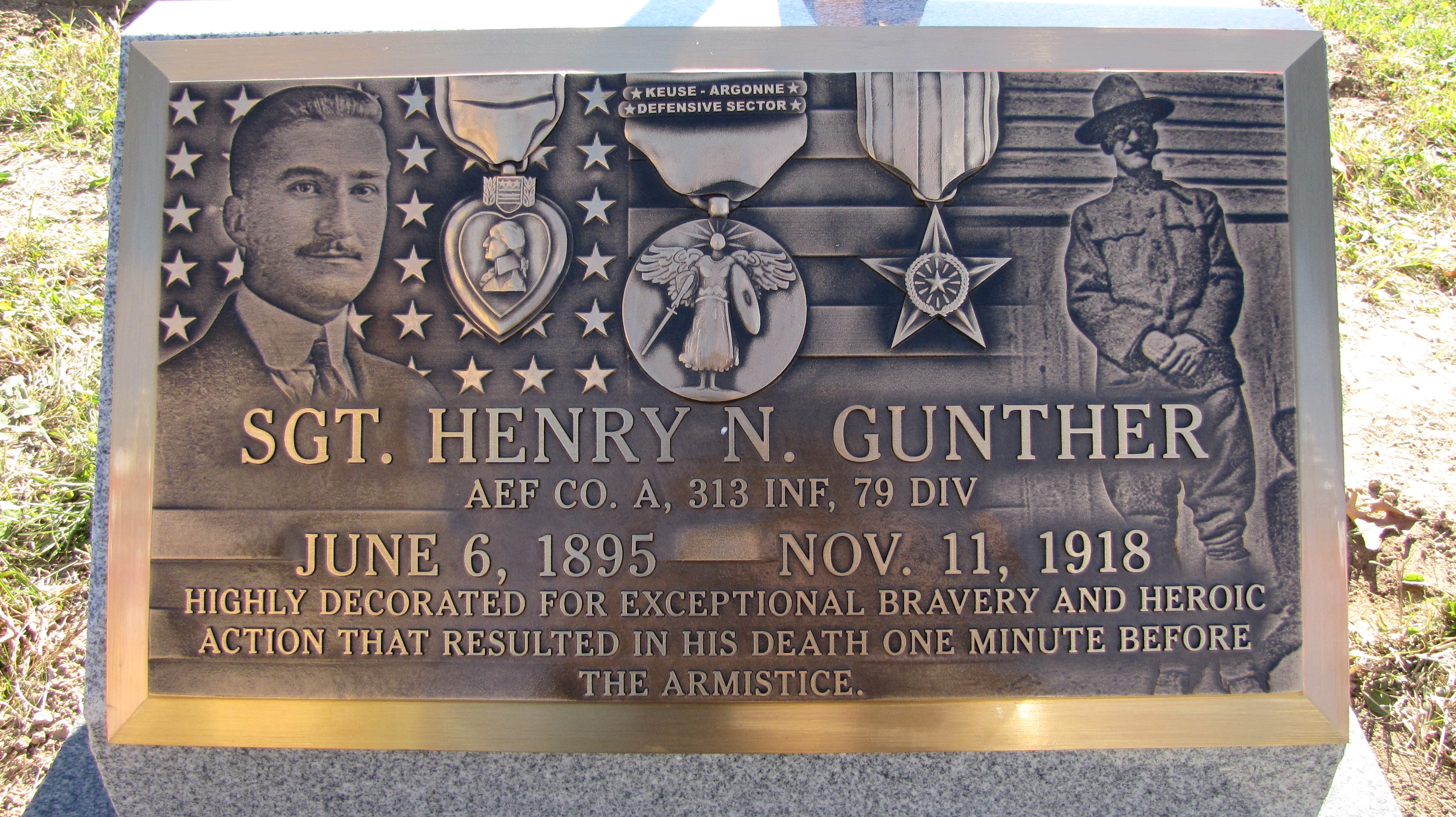
Commemorative plaque at the grave of Henry Gunther in Most Holy Redeemer Cemetery in Baltimore, unveiled on November 11, 2010.

On Veterans Day (called Armistice Day in France), November 11, 2008, a memorial was constructed near the place in Chaumont-devant-Damvillers in Lorraine where Gunther died. Two years later on the same remembrance holiday observance, November 11, 2010, a memorial plaque was also unveiled at his grave site in America at 10:59 a.m. by the German Society of Maryland.

== See also ==
- Albert Mayer, the first soldier killed, 1914
- George Edwin Ellison, the last British Army soldier killed, 1918
- George Lawrence Price, the last Canadian Expeditionary Force and British Empire/Commonwealth soldier killed, 1918
- Marcel Toussaint Terfve, the last Belgian soldier killed in World War I, 1918
- Augustin Trébuchon, the last French Army soldier killed, 1918
- John Parr, the first British Army soldier killed, 1914
- Jules-André Peugeot, the first French Army soldier killed, 1914
- History of the Germans in Baltimore
