= Battle of Tulgas =

1918 battle in the Russian Civil War

Coordinates: 62.594388°N 43.507833°E

- Part of the Allied North Russia Intervention during the Russian Civil War
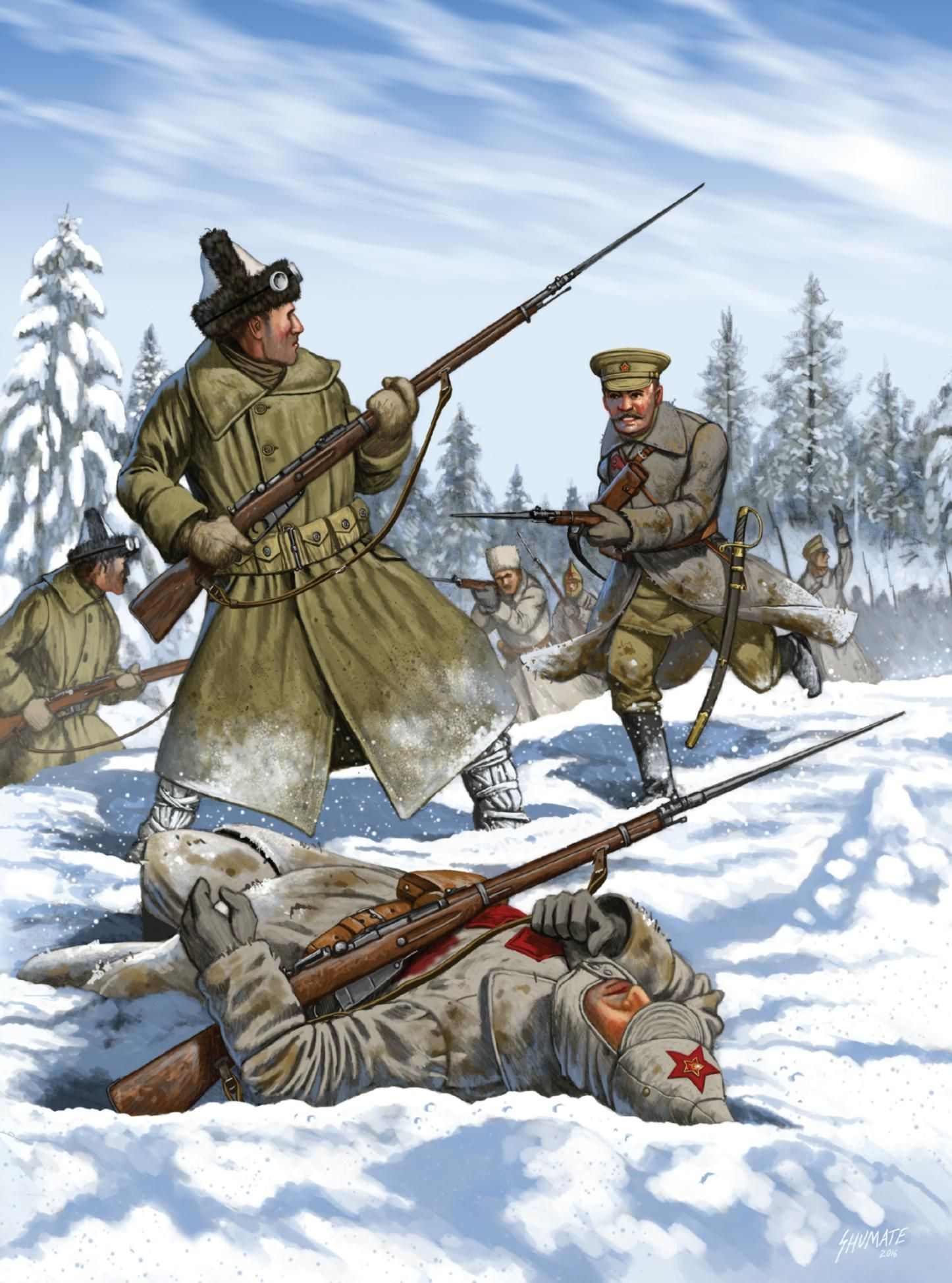
- Illustration of the battle, White Russians battling Bolsheviks
Date	November 11–14, 1918
Location	Tulgas, by the Northern Dvina River, Russian SFSR
Result	Allied victory

Belligerents
United Kingdom; France; United States; Canada; White Russia	(Russian Soviet Federative Socialist Republic) Soviet Russia

Commanders and leaders
(Canada) Robert Boyd	(Russian Soviet Federative Socialist Republic) Melochofski †

Strength
One US Rifle Company (300 men); One British Rifle Company; Canadian Artillery Battery (57 men) Around 600 men total	Ma~2,500 infantry Several river gunboats

Casualties and losses
30 killed 100 wounded	Unknown; Estimated at 500 killed ~30 captured
- At least three civilians killed

The Battle of Tulgas was part of the North Russia Intervention into the Russian Civil War and was fought between Allied and Bolshevik troops on the Northern Dvina River 200 miles (320 km) south of Arkhangelsk. It took place on the day the armistice ending World War I was signed, November 11, 1918, and is sometimes referred to as "The Battle of Armistice Day." Shortly before the battle, the freezing of the local waterways resulted in the cutting off of the Tulgas Garrison from outside assistance, and the freezing of the ground let the Bolsheviks move troops to surround Tulgas. The Bolsheviks used this opportunity and their superior numbers to try to attack and conquer the isolated outpost, but were driven back with severe losses.

== Allied positions ==
The Allied forces were deployed at the village of Tulgas on the west bank of the Dvina River. The southernmost Allied position was a single squad under Lieutenant Harry M. Dennis in a cluster of buildings called Upper Tulgas. To the north was a small but deep tributary of the Dvina, with a single wooden bridge across it. On the north bank of the river was an American log blockhouse, as well as the village church and the house of the priest. A couple hundred yards north of Upper Tulgas across the bridge was the main village of Tulgas, where most of the Allied troops were stationed under Captain Robert Boyd. Farther north was the Canadian field artillery battery, with two three-inch guns, as well as an American squad with a Lewis machine gun. Farthest north was another small village, Lower Tulgas; here the Allied field hospital was set up in a log hut, almost unguarded.

== The battle ==
On the morning of November 11, Bolshevik infantry attacked the American position in Upper Tulgas. Lieutenant Dennis realized that the attackers were too numerous and retreated across the stream to Tulgas itself. At about the same time another Bolshevik force of around 600 men attacked Lower Tulgas to the north, to the surprise of the Allies who thought that the swampy pine forest to the west had not frozen enough to be passed through. This force quickly captured the Allied field hospital and threatened the lightly-guarded Canadian artillery to the south. The Bolsheviks, led by "a giant of a man," the renowned Ukrainian ice fisher, Melochofski, spent several minutes ransacking Lower Tulgas, including the hospital. Melochofski ordered his soldiers to kill the wounded British and Americans in the hospital, but was stopped by two things: the British medical NCO, realizing that Melochofski and his men were probably tired, offered them rations and rum; and Melochofski's mistress, who had followed him to the battlefield, entered and said she would shoot the first soldier who tried to carry out the order. Melochofski countermanded the order; he would be mortally wounded hours later and die in his mistress's arms.

Melochofski's men left Lower Tulgas a few minutes later and charged south towards the Canadian artillery. But while the Bolsheviks were in Lower Tulgas, the Canadian gunners had swung their south-facing guns around, and fired two salvos at point blank range, killing many and driving the rest back. A company of Royal Scots came up from Tulgas to support the artillery; they traded rifle fire with the Bolsheviks and suffered severe casualties. Meanwhile, Captain Boyd's troops in Tulgas itself had been easily able to hold off the Bolsheviks approaching from the south, as the bridge that was the only route across the stream was defended by machine gun fire from the strong log blockhouse. Shortly before nightfall on the 11th Lieutenant Dennis led a group of men to dislodge Bolshevik snipers from the edge of the forest. At around the same time the Canadian gunners bombarded buildings in Lower Tulgas where Bolsheviks had taken refuge (except for the hospital), and then swung the guns around to fire two salvos into the woods to the south. As night fell the Allied forces were surrounded, with the telegraph line to Archangel cut by the Bolsheviks, and the prospect of reinforcement slim.

On the morning of November 12, Bolshevik gunboats appeared on the Dvina, and began lobbing six-inch shells at the Allied positions. They were joined by a battery of howitzers that had been landed in the woods near Upper Tulgas. The heavy bombardment targeted the American blockhouse by the bridge across the stream, and at noon a shell landed on the blockhouse, destroying it and killing two men. The Bolshevik soldiers charged the bridge, but were driven back by two Lewis guns, one of which was set up in the village church. The Bolsheviks attacked the bridge repeatedly, but were driven back by machine gun fire each time. Meanwhile, in the north, the Royal Scots retook Lower Tulgas, and found their wounded from the hospital still alive, under the care of Melochofski's mistress.

November 13 saw repeated Bolshevik attacks on the bridge, all unsuccessful. The Bolshevik forces continued their bombardment, averaging one shell every 15 seconds, a heavy bombardment even by the standards of the western front of World War I. The Allied commanders decided that their only hope for victory was a counterattack. In the early morning of November 14, the American forces, led by Lieutenant John Cudahy advanced stealthily to the woods near Upper Tulgas, where the Bolshevik troops were encamped. The Americans attacked, making as much noise as possible to make it seem like they had been reinforced. They drove the Bolsheviks back and captured a building full of small arms ammunition; when they set this on fire the sound of the exploding rifle ammunition seems to have convinced the Bolsheviks that they were outnumbered. When Cudahy's troops reached Upper Tulgas, the few Bolshevik snipers left surrendered.

That same day, temperatures dropped and the Dvina River began to freeze over, forcing the Bolshevik gunboats to retreat back up the river, and the Bolshevik infantry began to retreat. The troops in the north, near Lower Tulgas, had difficulty finding their way back; many were later captured or found dead.

== Aftermath ==
The Allies had successfully beaten off the Bolshevik attack, inflicting heavy casualties on them. There were at least three civilian casualties; during the battle the house of the village priest was hit, and the priest and his two children were killed. The Allied officers decided that Upper Tulgas, which had been used as cover for Bolshevik snipers, was a threat to the main garrison. There was also a rumor that the villagers of Upper Tulgas had been too hospitable to the Bolshevik troops. The Allies gave the villagers three hours to evacuate, and then burned Upper Tulgas to the ground.

== See also ==
- North Russia Campaign
- Australian contribution to the Allied Intervention in Russia 1918–1919
