= Chaumont-devant-Damvillers =

- Commune
- Coat of arms
- Location of Chaumont-devant-Damvillers
- Location within France Location within Grand Est
- Coordinates: 49°18′28″N 5°25′35″E
- Country: France
- Region: Grand Est
- Department: Meuse
- Arrondissement: Verdun
- Canton: Montmédy
- Intercommunality: CC Damvillers Spincourt

Government
  - Mayor (2020–2026): Yannick Jeanjean
- Area^{1}: 5.35 km^{2} (2.07 sq mi)
- Elevation: 235 m (771 ft)
- Highest elevation: 329 m (1,079 ft)
- Lowest elevation: 218 m (715 ft)
- Population (2023): 46
  - Density: 8.6/km^{2} (22/sq mi)
- Time zone: UTC+01:00 (CET)
  - Summer (DST): UTC+02:00 (CEST)
- INSEE/Postal code: 55107 /55150
- ^{1} French Land Register data, which excludes lakes, ponds, glaciers > 1 km^{2} (0.386 sq mi or 247 acres) and river estuaries.

Chaumont-devant-Damvillers (French pronunciation: [ʃomɔ̃ dəvɑ̃ dɑ̃vile], lit. 'Chaumont before Damvillers') is a commune in the Meuse department in Grand Est in north-eastern France. It is known as the place where the last soldier to die in the First World War was killed, when American Henry Gunther died charging a German position sixty seconds before the Armistice came into effect.

== See also ==
- Communes of the Meuse department
