= Jean Toussaint de la Pierre, marquis de Frémeur =

Jean Toussaint de la Pierre, marquis de Frémeur (1697–1759) was a French noble and soldier. He commanded the 5th Dragoon Regiment between 1727 and 1744. Between 1758 and 1759 de Frémeur served as Governor of Minorca following its Capture of Minorca from the British in 1756. He died in the post on 2 April 1759.

== See also ==
- List of governors of Menorca

Military offices
Preceded by Hyacinthe Gaëtan de Lannion	Governor of Minorca; 1758–1759	Succeeded by Louis-Félicien d'Argenson
