= Francis Columbine =

Francis Columbine (died 22 September 1746) was a British Army officer and Governor of Gibraltar.

== Life ==
Columbine served in the wars of Queen Anne under John Churchill, 1st Duke of Marlborough, and was for many years an officer of the 8th Regiment of Foot, in which corps he rose to the rank of major. He was subsequently promoted to the lieutenant-colonelcy of the 10th Regiment of Foot and performed the duty of commanding officer of the 10th upwards of twelve years, keeping the regiment in a high state of discipline and efficiency. He was promoted to the rank of major-general on 29 October 1735, and was rewarded with the colonelcy of his own regiment (later the 10th Foot) on 27 January 1737. On 2 July 1739 he was advanced to the rank of lieutenant-general.

He was Governor of Gibraltar for six months between October 1739 and April 1740. Cathedral Square in Gibraltar is on the site of what was Columbine Street.

== Notes ==
Government offices
Preceded by Joseph Sabine	Governor of Gibraltar; 1739–1740	Succeeded by William Hargrave
Military offices
Preceded by Henry Grove	Colonel of Columbine's Regiment of Foot; 1737–1746	Succeeded by The Lord Tyrawley
