= St. Philip's Castle =

Fort on Menorca

Coordinates: 39°51′54″N 04°18′18″E

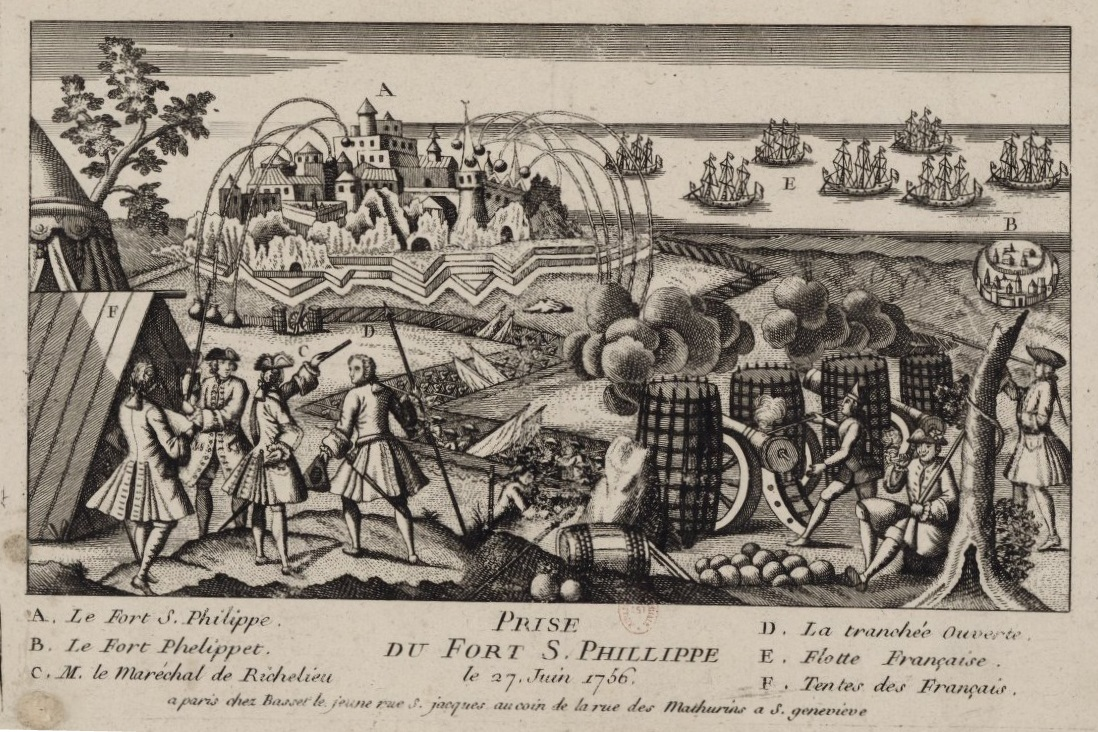
The siege of Fort St. Philip (1756).

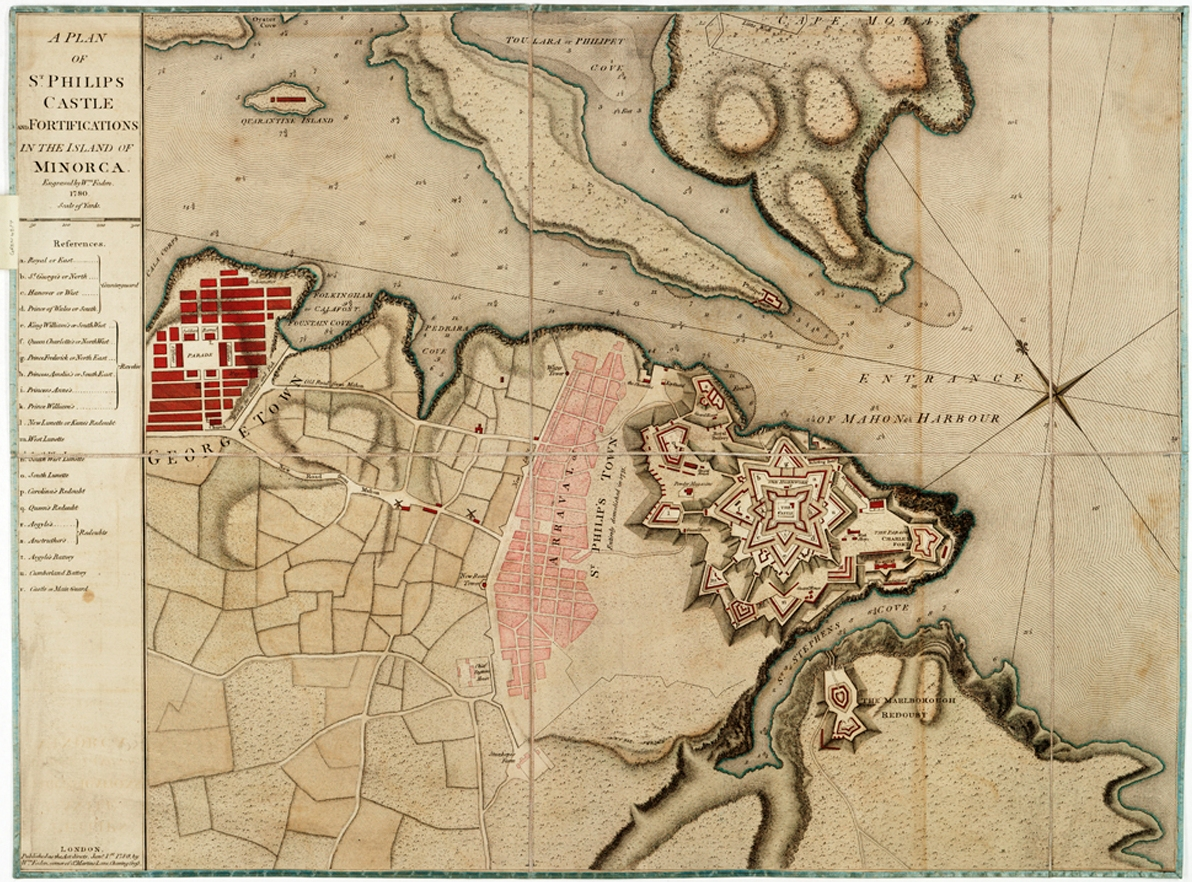
Plan of Fort St. Philip. (1780)

St. Philip's Castle (Catalan:Castell de Sant Felip, Spanish: Castillo de San Felipe, often known as Fort St Phillip) was a fortress guarding the entrance to the port of Mahón. It is located in the municipality of Es Castell, on the island of Menorca.

It was rebuilt by British forces in the 1760s, around an earlier Spanish fort, the Castell de Sant Felip, which had been established about 1554. It is best known for its unsuccessful defence on two occasions by the British: during the Siege of Fort St Philip (1756) and the Invasion of Minorca, 1781. Following the latter event, the castle was partly demolished.

== Lighthouse of Sant Carles ==
With its commanding position overlooking the entrance to Mahon harbour the area around the fort was considered a good location for a lighthouse, and in 1852 one was built on the Sant Carles point. The light was contained within a 16m masonry tower, rising from a single storey house. The drawback of the site was that it was in the direct line of fire from the military battery based at the castle.

The keepers of the lighthouse were warned when firing practice was to take place but they complained that the shells damaged the building and alarmed their families. The situation continued until 1912, when the lighthouse was closed and replaced with a moveable light on a metal davit. This was lowered during firing practice, and raised at other times to a give a range of 9.5 nautical miles.

In the 1970s the moveable light was replaced by a post light, mounted on a 15m high concrete tower painted with black and white bands, giving an extended range of 13 nautical miles. The old lighthouse was finally demolished in 1917, parts of which being reused in the construction of the new lighthouse at Favàritx.
