= Mahón =

Mahón Maó (Catalan)
- Municipality
- Maó (official)
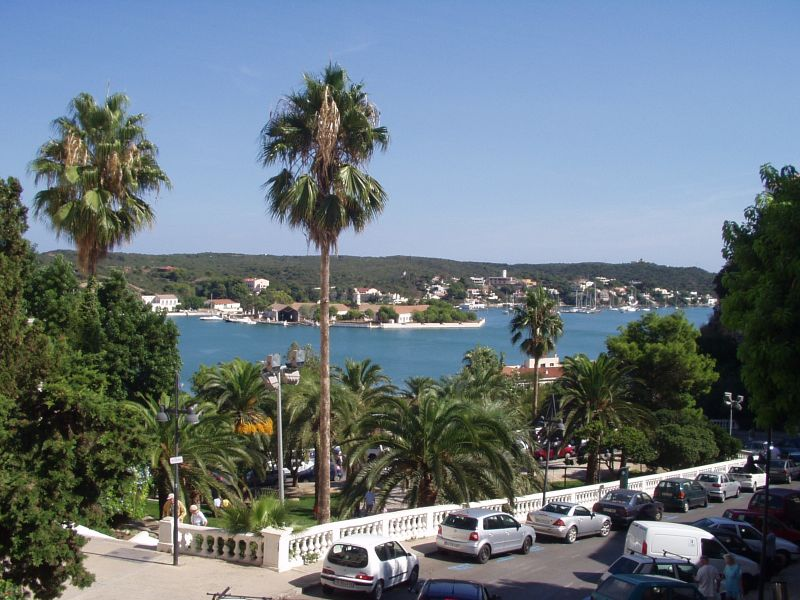
- Mahón Harbour

- Flag Coat of arms
- Interactive map of Mahón
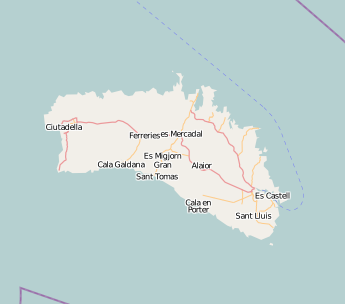
- Location in Menorca Mahón (Balearic Islands) Mahón (Spain)
- Coordinates: 39°53′15″N 4°15′40″E
- Country: Spain
- Autonomous community: Balearic Islands
- Province: Balearic Islands
- Island: Menorca
- Judicial district: Maó

Government
  - Mayor: Hector Pons Riudavets (PSOE)

Area
  - Total: 117.20 km^{2} (45.25 sq mi)
- Elevation: 72 m (236 ft)

Population (2025-01-01)
  - Total: 30,666
  - Density: 261.66/km^{2} (677.68/sq mi)
- Demonyms: maonès, maonesa (ca) mahonés, mahonesa (es)
- Time zone: UTC+1 (CET)
  - Summer (DST): UTC+2 (CEST)
- Postal code: 07700-07714
- Website: www.ajmao.org

Mahón (Spanish: [maˈon]), historically known as Port Mahon in English, officially and in Catalan Maó (Balearic Catalan: [məˈo], locally [ˈmo]; formerly spelled Mahó), is the capital and second largest city of the island of Menorca, Spain. The city is on the eastern coast of the island, which is part of the archipelago and autonomous community of the Balearic Islands.

Mahón has one of the longest natural harbours in the world: 5 kilometres (3 miles) long and up to 900 metres (3,000 feet) wide. The water is deep but remains mostly clear due to the port's enclosed nature.

Mayonnaise is considered to have originated in Mahón, and gotten its name from it.

Its population in 2021 was estimated to be 29,125.

== History ==
The name's origin is attributed to the Carthaginian general Mago Barca, brother to Hannibal, who is thought to have taken refuge there in 205 BC. After the fall of the Western Roman Empire, it became part of the Eastern Roman Empire; it suffered raids from Vikings and Arabs until the Islamic Caliphate of Córdoba conquered it in 903.

Mahón was captured in 1287 from the Moors by Alfonso III of Aragon and incorporated into the Kingdom of Majorca, a vassal kingdom of the Crown of Aragon. Its harbour, one of the most strategically important in the western Mediterranean, was refortified.

In 1535, the Ottomans, under Hayreddin Barbarossa, attacked Mahón and took 600 captives as slaves back to Algiers, in the Sack of Mahon.

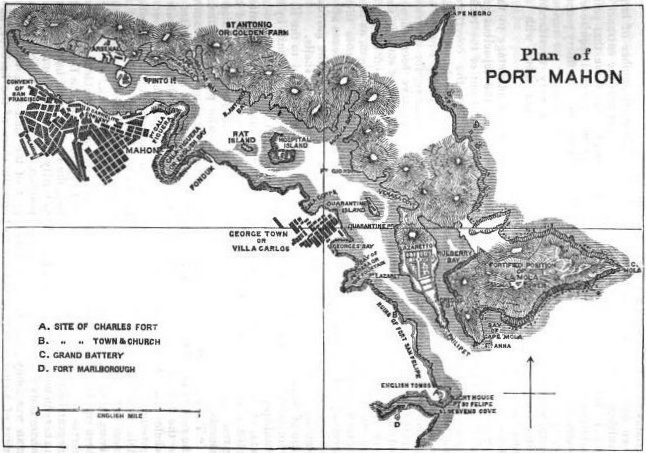
1890 map of Mahón and surrounding region

=== British rule ===
Menorca was captured in 1708 by a joint British–Dutch force on behalf of Holy Roman Emperor Charles VI, during the War of the Spanish Succession. The British saw the island's potential as a naval base and sought to take full control. Its status as a British possession was confirmed by the Treaty of Utrecht in 1713. During the island's years as a British dependency, the capital was moved from Ciutadella de Menorca to Mahon, which then served as residence for the governor, the most famous being General Richard Kane. During this period the natural harbour leading to the town and surrounding settlements were sometimes collectively known as "Port Mahon" (see adjacent map).

The island was lost to the French in 1756 following the naval Battle of Menorca and the final Siege of Fort St Philip, which took place several miles from the town. After their defeat in the Seven Years' War, France returned the island to the British in 1763. In a joint Franco-Spanish effort and following a long five month invasion, the British surrendered the island again in 1782; It was transferred to Spain in 1783 as part of the Peace of Paris. The British recaptured the island in 1798, during the French Revolutionary Wars. The British and the French tried (and failed) to end their hostilities with the Treaty of Amiens in 1802. Both nations agreed to cede or withdraw from certain territories, with the island of Menorca passing to the Spanish, with whom it has remained since.

==== The Royal Navy ====
A small but important Royal Navy Dockyard was established by the British on the north side of the harbour, opposite the town, in 1715. It served as the Royal Navy's principal Mediterranean base for much of the 18th century, and remains in use today as a Spanish Naval station. Several Dockyard buildings, dating from the 1760s, can still be seen on Illa Pinto (formerly known as Saffron Island) including a Naval Storehouse with clock tower. There recently have been moves to establish a maritime museum here. The island has a distinctive octagonal shape, formed when wharves were constructed around it in the 1760s to enable several warships to be careened there all at once.

The ruins of a former Royal Naval Hospital, founded in 1711, stand on another nearby island (Illa del Rei). They recently have been restored.

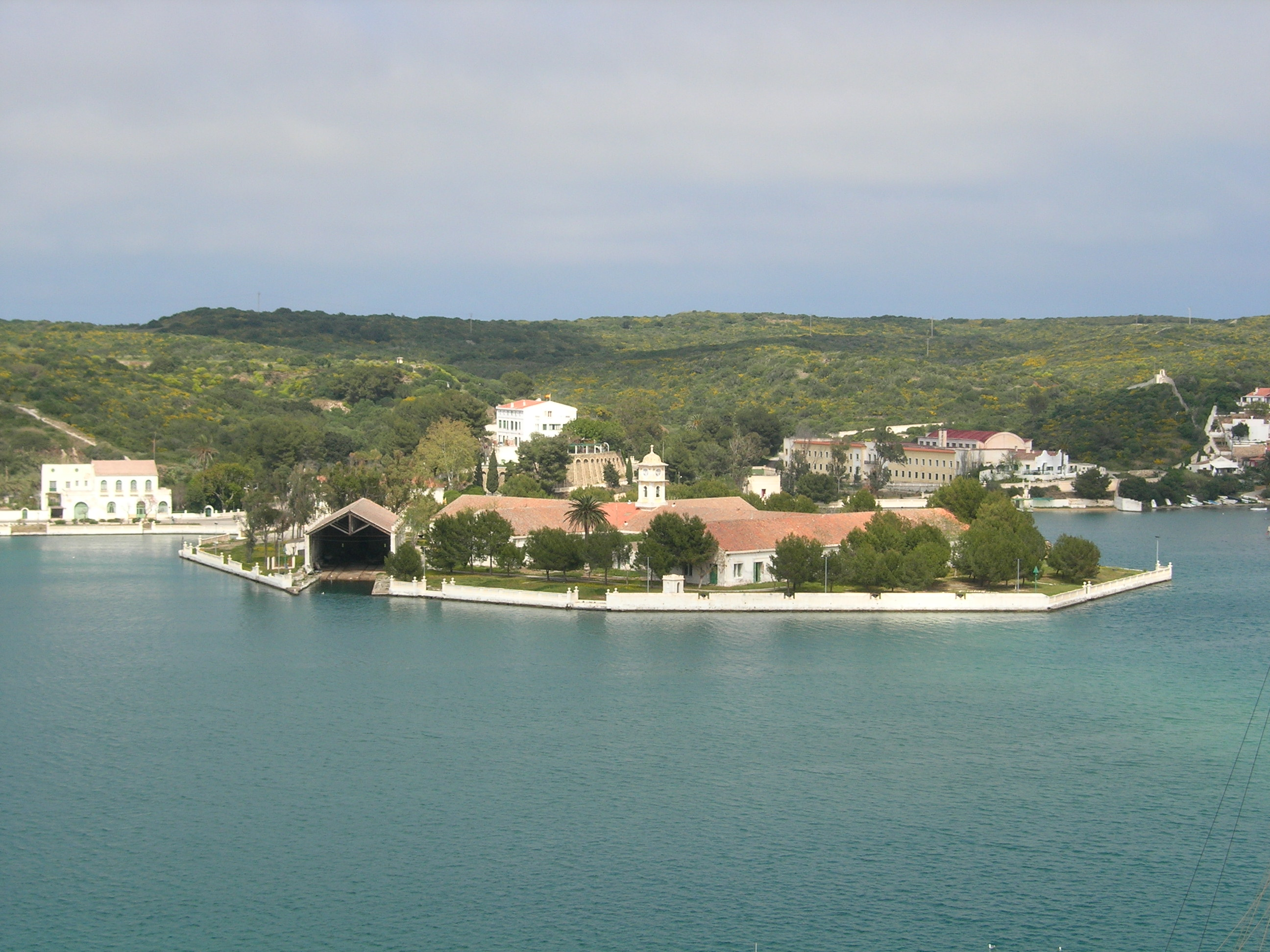
Naval storehouse and careening wharf on Illa Pinto

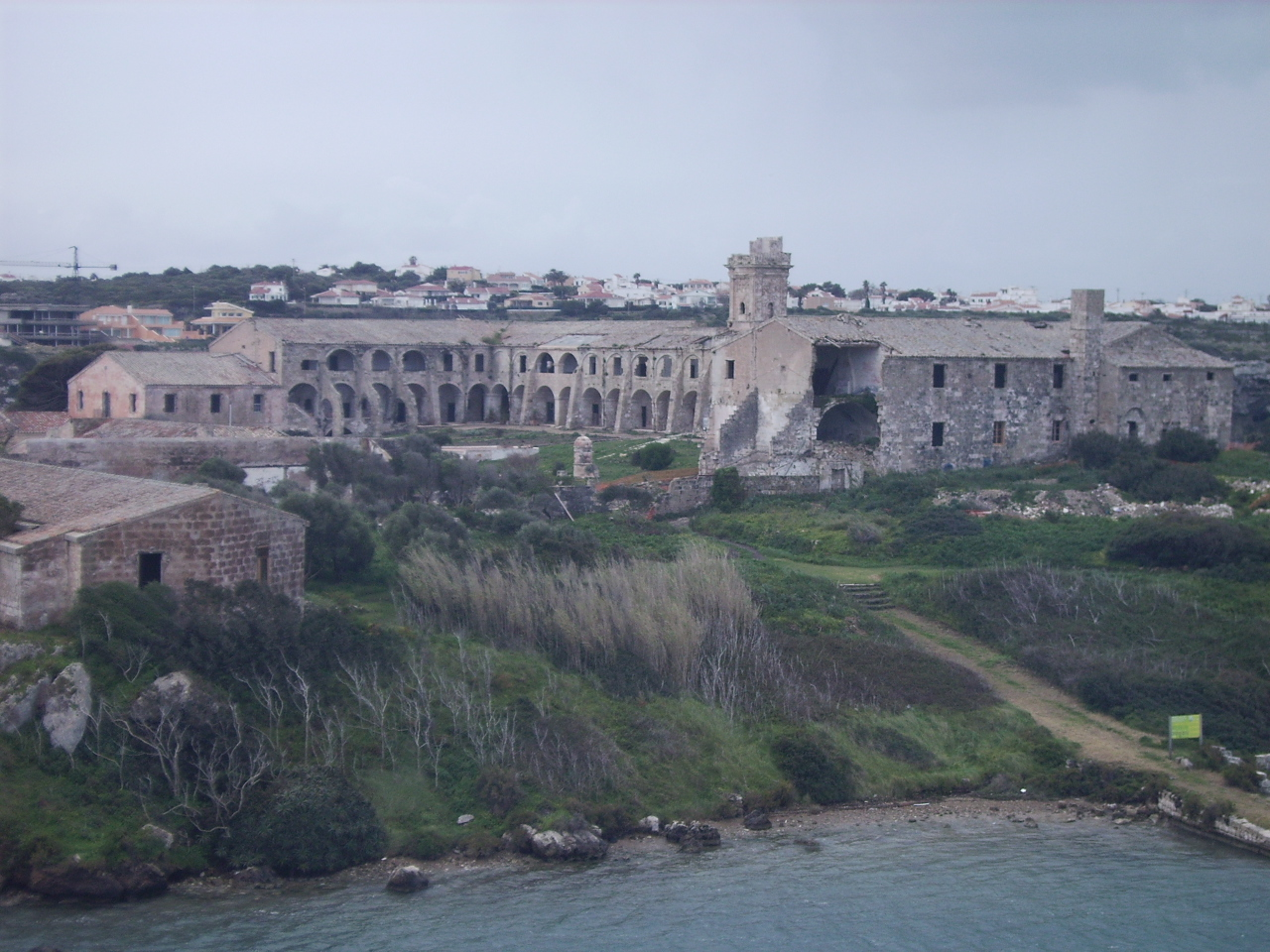
The ruined Naval Hospital in 2008

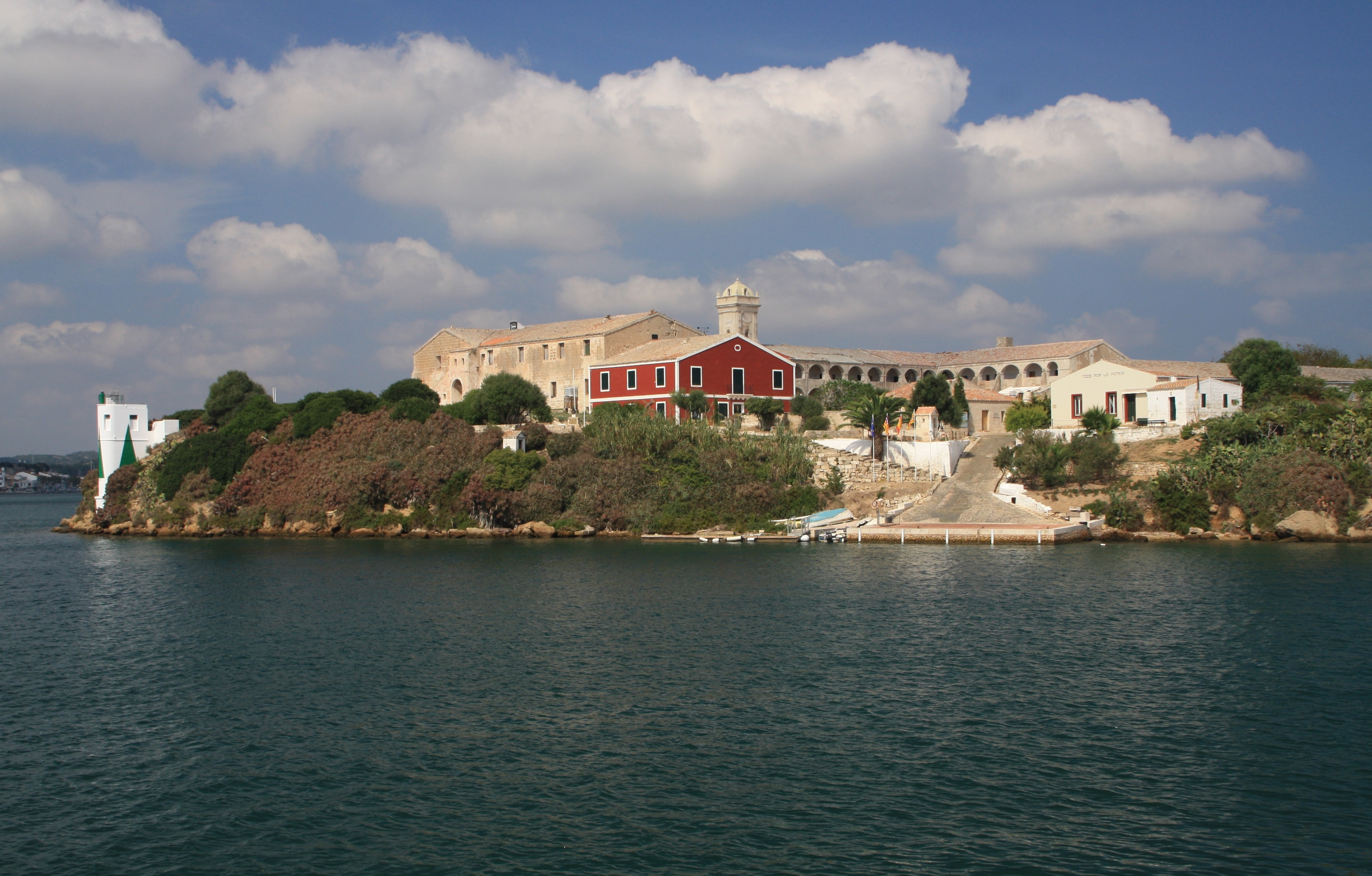
The hospital in 2011, following restoration

=== 20th century ===
During the Spanish Civil War, the island remained loyal to the Republic, but was captured by the Nationalists in 1939. During the battle to capture the islands from the republicans, Mahón was bombed by Francisco Franco's Nationalist bomber planes, with support from Benito Mussolini's Italian Fascist government.

General Franco visited the city on 11 May 1960 to open a new thermal power station. The event was used by the authorities to further promote Francoist Spain.

=== Modern era ===
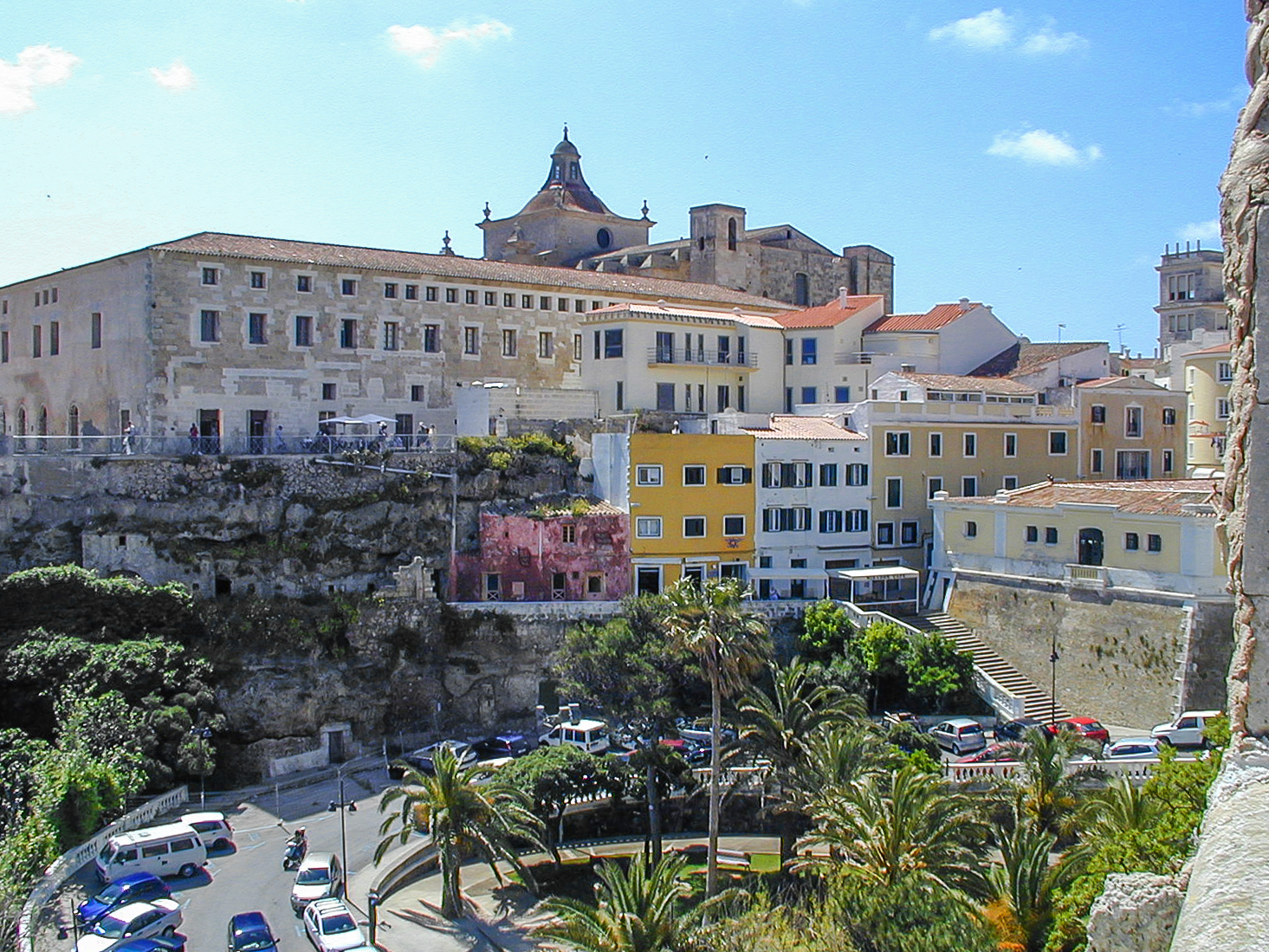
Historic centre of Mahón

Today it serves as the seat of the Island Council of Menorca (Consell Insular de Menorca).

Towards the end of the 20th century, the renovation of its historic centre was made possible by income from tourism.

A traditional cheese made on the island (Mahón cheese) is named after the city. In Spanish mahón is also the name of nankeen, especially the blue cloth.

== Sport ==
Mahón has an athletics track in the Carrer de Vasallo, as well as several other sport facilities. The city also has a sports centre with a municipal pool, and 2 tennis clubs.

=== Football ===
Mahón has several association football teams, including UD Mahón, CD Menorca and CF Sporting de Mahón. The most noteworthy and successful club in Menorcan history, CF Sporting Mahonés, was the only football club in Menorca ever to reach Segunda División B. The team disbanded in 2013, and Sporting de Mahón took its place. As of 2024, no team in Mahón is in the Tercera Federación or higher.

=== Basketball ===
In basketball, Mahón has the Pavelló Menorca, with capacity of 5000 spectator. The venue is most known for hosting one of the few teams in the Balearic Islands to be at the Spanish first division of basketball, Liga ACB; that team was Menorca Bàsquet. After staying 5 seasons in their history at Liga ACB, the directors closed the club due to debts.

Mahón had to wait 5 years to get another basketball club, CB Menorca, considered by many to be Menorca Bàsquet's phoenix club. After 5 seasons in LEB Plata, on the 2022-23 LEB Plata season CB Menorca gained promotion to LEB Oro, making Menorca host basketball second division matches after a decade, and, in their first LEB Oro season, the team finished 12th.

== Notable residents ==
- Juan Ramis, lawyer and historian (1746–1819)
- Pasqual Calbó i Caldés, painter (1752–1816)
- Mathieu Orfila, toxicologist (1787–1853)
- Orestes Araújo, Uruguayan historian and educator (1853–1915)
- José María Martín Domingo, composer and musician (1889–1961)
- Francesc de Borja Moll i Casasnovas, linguist and philologist (1903–1991)
- Sergio Llull, basketball player at Real Madrid (born 1987)

== Climate ==
Mahón/Menorca has a Hot-summer Mediterranean climate (Köppen: Csa) with mild, somewhat humid winters and dry, hot summers. Autumn is the wettest season and heavy rain is not rare during October and November.

Climate data for Menorca Airport 91m (1981–2010)
Month	Jan	Feb	Mar	Apr	May	Jun	Jul	Aug	Sep	Oct	Nov	Dec	Year
Mean daily maximum °C (°F)	14.1 (57.4)	14.2 (57.6)	15.9 (60.6)	18.0 (64.4)	21.6 (70.9)	25.8 (78.4)	28.9 (84.0)	29.2 (84.6)	26.2 (79.2)	22.7 (72.9)	18.1 (64.6)	15.2 (59.4)	20.8 (69.4)
Daily mean °C (°F)	10.8 (51.4)	10.8 (51.4)	12.3 (54.1)	14.3 (57.7)	17.8 (64.0)	21.8 (71.2)	24.9 (76.8)	25.4 (77.7)	22.6 (72.7)	19.4 (66.9)	14.9 (58.8)	12.1 (53.8)	17.2 (63.0)
Mean daily minimum °C (°F)	7.5 (45.5)	7.4 (45.3)	8.6 (47.5)	10.6 (51.1)	13.9 (57.0)	17.8 (64.0)	20.8 (69.4)	21.5 (70.7)	18.9 (66.0)	16.1 (61.0)	11.6 (52.9)	9.0 (48.2)	13.6 (56.5)
Average precipitation mm (inches)	52 (2.0)	54 (2.1)	38 (1.5)	45 (1.8)	37 (1.5)	14 (0.6)	3 (0.1)	20 (0.8)	61 (2.4)	78 (3.1)	88 (3.5)	61 (2.4)	546 (21.5)
Average precipitation days (≥ 1 mm)	7	7	6	6	4	2	1	2	5	7	8	9	64
Mean monthly sunshine hours	144	146	202	222	270	311	347	312	225	183	142	130	2,632
Source: Agencia Estatal de Meteorología

== Other ==
Municipality of Mahón in Menorca

At 39.8565°N 4.2915°E, there is a large military Wullenweber antenna for radio direction finding.

== Twin towns ==
- Cervia, Italy

== See also ==
- List of deepest natural harbours
