= Sir Herbert Miles Promenade =

Artilliery battery in Gibralta

- Part of Fortifications of Gibraltar
- Gibraltar

Location
- Location within Gibraltar
- Coordinates: 36.13833°N 5.35472°W

Site history
- Built: 1917

Sir Herbert Miles Promenade served as an artillery battery in the British Overseas Territory of Gibraltar.

== Description ==
The promenade runs along the Line Wall Curtain, from King's Bastion at the north end to Wellington Front on the south. It passes by Cathedral Square when it is immediately west of the Cathedral of the Holy Trinity. The battery housed 200 guns during the Great Siege of Gibraltar. Today there are just nine guns in place.

The promenade is named after Sir Herbert Miles who was Governor of Gibraltar (1913–18).
