= Lord Tyrawley's Regiment of Foot =

Two regiments of the British Army have been known as Lord Tyrawley's Regiment of Foot:

- 7th Regiment of Foot, which James O'Hara, 2nd Baron Tyrawley was colonel of from 1713 to 1739
- 10th Regiment of Foot, which Tyrawley was colonel of from 1746 to 1749
