= Richard Kane =

Irish army officer (1662–1736)

Brigadier-General Richard Kane
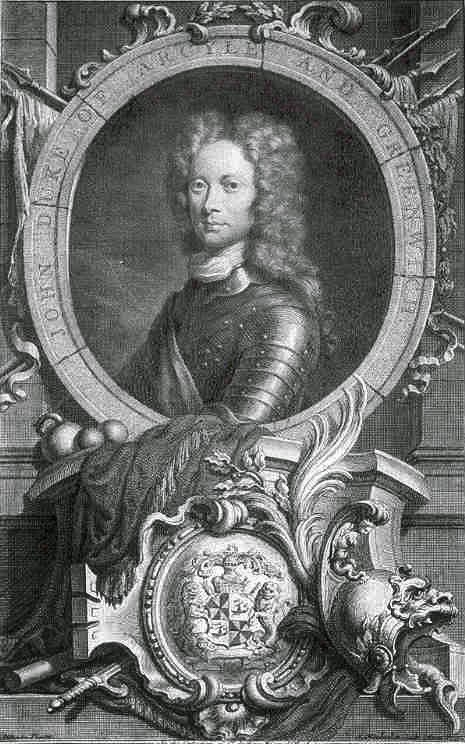
- Born: 20 December 1662; Duneane, County Antrim
- Died: 19 December 1736 (aged 73); Mahon, Minorca
- Military career
- Allegiance: Williamites; England; Great Britain
- Branch: Army of the North; English Army; British Army
- Service years: 1688–1736
- Rank: Brigadier-general (British Army)
- Unit: Earl of Meath's Regiment of Foot
- Commands: Richard Kanes's Regiment of Foot
- Conflicts: Williamite War in Ireland; Siege of Derry; Battle of the Boyne; Siege of Limerick (1690); Nine Years' War; Siege of Namur (1695); War of the Spanish Succession; Battle of Blenheim; Queen Anne's War; Quebec expedition (1711); Anglo-Spanish War (1727–1729); Thirteenth siege of Gibraltar

Brigadier-General Richard Kane (born Richard O'Cahan; 20 December 1662 – 19 December 1736) was an Irish officer in the British Army who served as the acting governor of Gibraltar from 1725 to 1727. He also served as the governor of Menorca from 1733 to 1736, having been its lieutenant governor since 1712.

== Origins ==
Richard O'Cahan was born to Thomas O'Cahan and his wife, Margaret Dobbin, at his mother's home in Duneane, County Antrim on 20 December 1662. In 1688, he anglicised his name to Kane and joined a volunteer Protestant regiment in his home town, Carrickfergus, raised to oppose James II's Catholic rule.

== Nine Years' War and War of the Spanish Succession ==
Kane was commissioned as a lieutenant into the Antrim Volunteers, a unit of the Army of the North, a force of Williamite Protestants raised to oppose the Irish Army which was loyal to James II. Kane took part in resisting the siege of Derry in 1689. Shortly afterwards, he joined the Earl of Meath's Regiment of Foot and fought in the Williamite War in Ireland. He was present at the Battle of the Boyne and siege of Limerick in 1690.

His regiment was singled out in recognition of its bravery during the siege of Namur at which he was wounded. In 1702, William died and the Duke of Marlborough took command of the army. Kane fought under Marlborough in several battles of the War of the Spanish Succession and was severely wounded at the Battle of Blenheim. In December 1710, Queen Anne named him colonel of his own regiment of foot (formerly the regiment of the disgraced George Macartney), which was finally disbanded in 1717.

In 1711, Kane sailed to Canada in an unsuccessful expedition under General John Hill to take Quebec from the French. During the expedition, he visited Boston. In the following year, Kane commanded a British force which captured Dunkirk, an occupation that ended disastrously when an epidemic killed half of his men.

== Menorca and Gibraltar ==
In the summer of 1712, Queen Anne signed orders for the Duke of Argyll to proceed to the Spanish island of Menorca as its Governor. Menorca had been captured by the British in 1708 and under the terms of the peace treaty then being negotiated, the island would remain in British hands. Argyll remained titular governor for the next three years, but the work was really for Richard Kane, the lieutenant governor. He arrived 10 November 1712 and remained on the island, apart from a few absences, until his death twenty four years later.

In Menorca, against the interference of the Roman Catholic Church and always short of funds, Kane reformed the legal system, drew up a new constitution, built a road connecting the old Spanish capital, Ciudadela, with Mahón, the new capital, and improved trade by making Mahon a free port. He introduced new agricultural methods and imported new varieties of cereal, new breeds of cattle and drought-resistant clover to feed them.

In 1720–1721, he was appointed to take command of the garrison in Gibraltar when it was threatened by Spain and, in 1725, George I ordered Kane to Gibraltar again to strengthen the defences and ward off Spanish invaders. This he did, at the same time recommending a civil government for "the Rock". George I rewarded him in 1725 for his work by giving him the colonelcy of his own regiment. Kane returned to Menorca in February 1727, just before the Spanish launched an unsuccessful siege on Gibraltar.

He was formally appointed Governor of Menorca in 1733 and given the rank of brigadier general in 1735. He was not knighted. Richard Kane died in Mahon on 19 December 1736 after almost twenty five years of devoted service on the island. He was buried in the chapel of St. Philip's Castle which was later bombed by the Spanish. A bust by J. M. Ruysback with a Latin inscription listing his many achievements is in Westminster Abbey. Although an excellent soldier, Kane is best remembered as a colonial administrator devoted to the people in his care.

== Memorial at Westminster Abbey ==
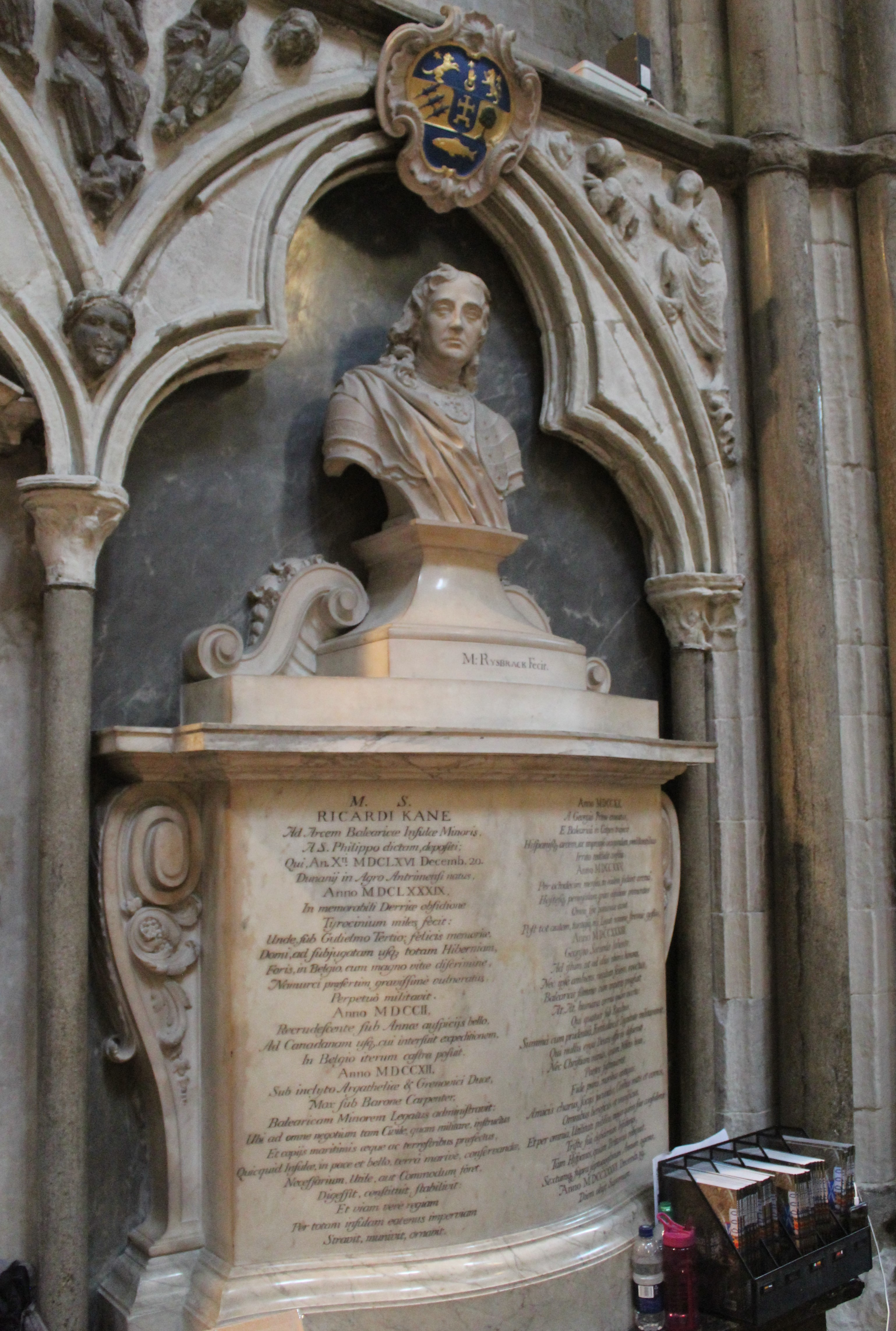
Monument to Kane in Westminster Abbey

In the west aisle of the north transept in Westminster Abbey is a memorial to Kane by the sculptor John Michael Rysbrack. It consists of a monument in white, grey and black marbles with a bust in armour with shoulder length hair on a pedestal. The Latin inscription can be translated:

Sacred to the memory of Richard Kane laid to rest at the citadel of the Balearic island of Menorca named for Saint Philip, who was born on December 20, 1666, at Duneane in County Antrim. In 1689, he served his military apprenticeship in the famous siege of Derry, whereafter, under William III of blessed memory, he continued in armed service both at home, until the subjugation of all Ireland, and abroad, in Flanders, at great risk of life, not least by reason of a grave wound received at the siege of Namur. In 1702, when war broke out afresh in the reign of Queen Anne, again he campaigned in Belgium before joining the expedition to Canada. In 1712, under the renowned Duke of Argyll and Greenwich, and later under Baron Carpenter, he acted as civil governor of Menorca where, capably undertaking all tasks, both civil and military, and in command of army and navy alike, he planned, ordered and maintained everything that was necessary, expedient or beneficial for the preservation of the island, in war and in peace, on sea and on land, and also had paved, fortified and adorned a truly royal road throughout the length of an island hitherto impassable. In 1720, at the behest of George I, he crossed from Mahon to Gibraltar and thwarted an attack by the Spaniards who planned to take it by surprise. In 1725, he returned to the same scene of action for eighteen months and, when the enemy laid the Peninsula under heavy siege, quashed their every hope of taking it. After this sequence of sterling achievements as Lieutenant Governor in 1733 at the command of George II neither by his own seeking nor with prior knowledge, as with his other offices wheresoever held, he was elevated to the supreme command in Menorca. But oh, oh, how uncertain is the life of man! He who under four sovereigns had borne arms with the greatest shrewdness, courage and dignity, who had served God with all his heart and played the role not less of a Christian than of a good soldier, of pure faith and old-fashioned courtesy, dear to his friends, amiable to his associates, affable to his people, kind and generous to all, and in all things concerned more for the public good than for his own, left an island that was both British and Spanish sadly mourning his loss and in his seventy sixth year on December 19, 1736, breathed his last.

== Bibliography ==
He left a Narrative of All the Campaigns of King William and the Duke of Marlborough and wrote A New System of Military Discipline for Foot on Action which became the British army's "bible" at the time.

Government offices
Preceded by George Carpenter, 1st Baron Carpenter	Governor of Menorca; 1733–1736	Succeeded by Earl of Hertford
Preceded by Earl of Portmore	Governor of Gibraltar; 1725–1727	Succeeded by Jasper Clayton
Military offices
Preceded by James Otway	Colonel of Richard Kanes's Regiment of Foot; 1725–1737	Succeeded by William Hargrave
