= Herbert Miles =

British Army general (1850–1926)

Lieutenant-General Sir Herbert Miles GCB GCMG GBE CVO
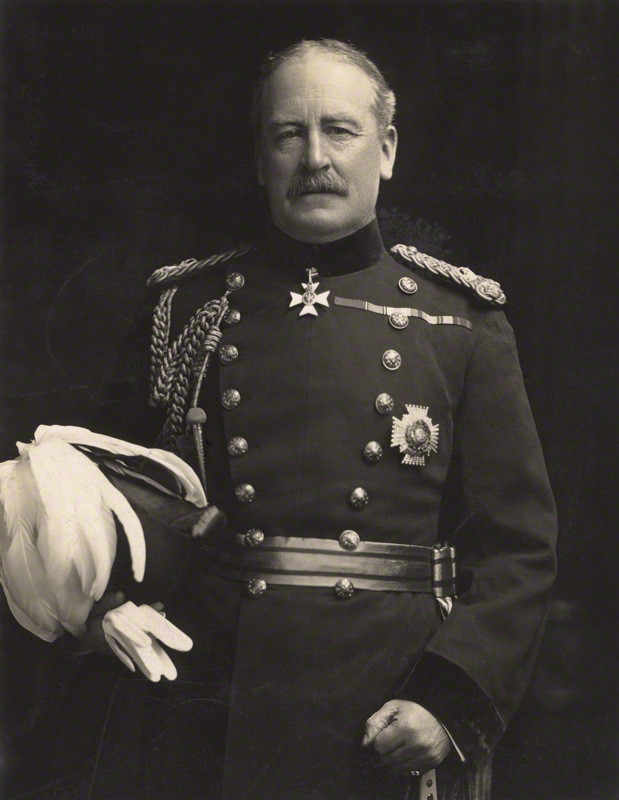
- Miles in c. 1913
- Born: 31 July 1850
- Died: 6 May 1926 (aged 75)
- Military career
- Allegiance: United Kingdom
- Branch: British Army
- Service years: 1869–1918
- Rank: Lieutenant-General
- Commands: British Troops in the Cape Colony; Staff College, Camberley
- Conflicts: Second Boer War; First World War
- Awards: Knight Grand Cross of the Order of the Bath; Knight Grand Cross of the Order of St Michael and St George; Knight Grand Cross of the Order of the British Empire; Commander of the Royal Victorian Order; Mentioned in Despatches (2); Grand Officer of the Legion of Honour (France); Grand Officer of the Order of the Crown of Italy; Knight Grand Cross of the Order of Isabella the Catholic (Spain)

Lieutenant-General Sir Herbert Scott Gould Miles (31 July 1850 – 6 May 1926) was a senior British Army officer. He was Quartermaster-General to the Forces from 1908 to 1912, and Governor of Gibraltar from 1913 until 1918 during the First World War.

== Military career ==
Miles was commissioned into the 101st Regiment of Foot in 1869.

He had a change of career and became a barrister in the Inner Temple in 1880.

He then rejoined the army, being promoted on 29 December 1888 to lieutenant colonel while serving on half-pay, becoming Deputy Assistant Quartermaster-General at the War Office in 1889 and then Assistant Adjutant-General at Aldershot Command in 1893. In 1898 he was appointed Commandant of the Staff College, Camberley.

He served in the Second Boer War, from 25 January 1900 as a deputy adjutant general and chief of staff for the Natal Field Force. After the war he returned to his role as commandant of the Staff College and then, in 1903, became Commander of British Troops in the Cape Colony District. He was promoted on 5 December 1903 to major general, appointed Director of Recruiting and Organisation at Army Headquarters in 1904 and Quartermaster-General to the Forces in 1908. He was promoted to lieutenant general on 20 August 1909.

He succeeded Lieutenant General John Wimburn Laurie as colonel of the Royal Munster Fusiliers in May 1912 and governor of Gibraltar from 1913; he retired in 1919.

== Legacy ==
Sir Herbert Miles Road in Gibraltar is named in his honour as is Sir Herbert Miles Promenade. There is a memorial to him in St Peter's Church in Yoxford, Suffolk.

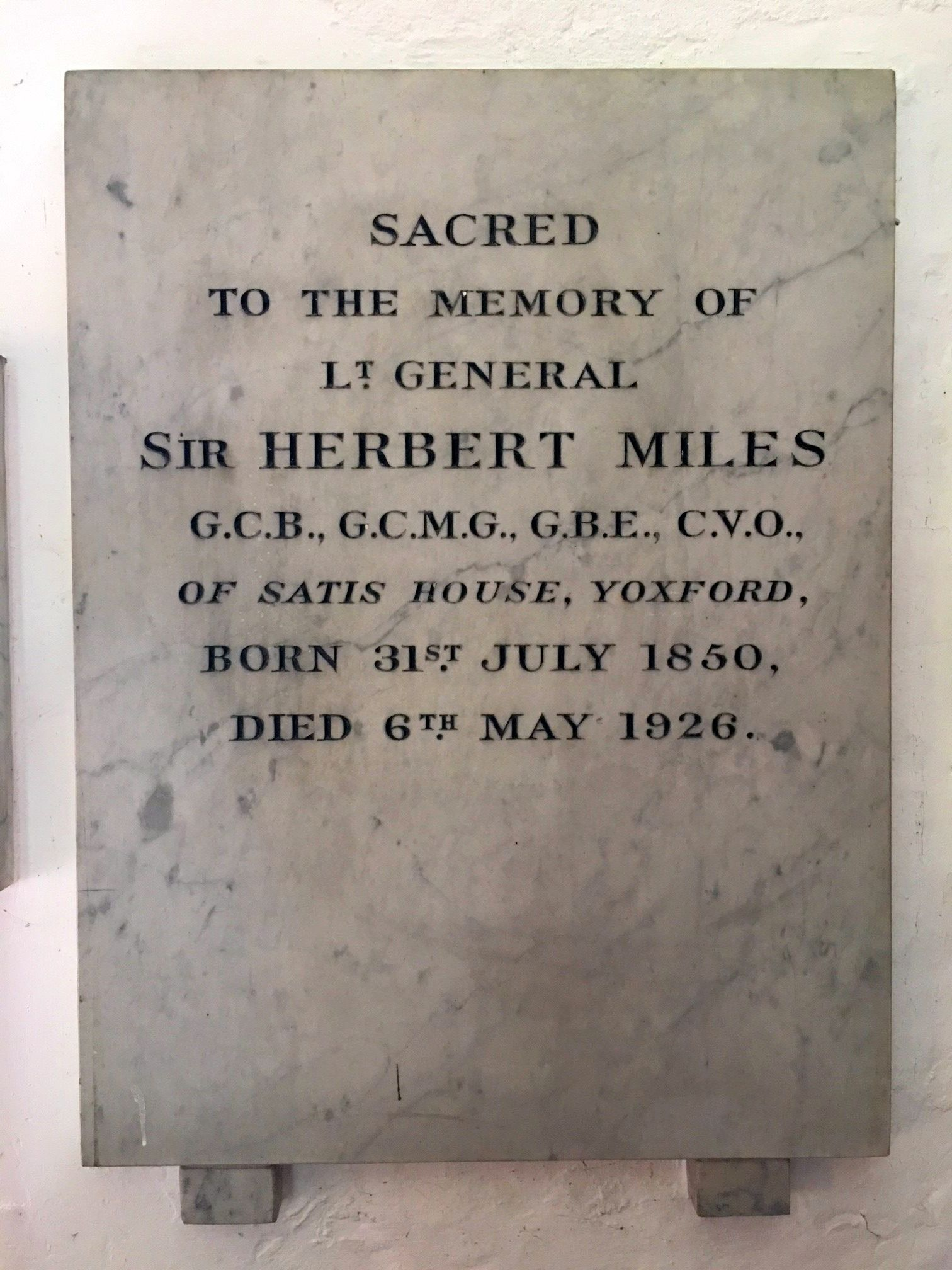
Herbert Miles memorial in St Peter's Church, Yoxford, Suffolk

Military offices
Preceded by Henry Hildyard	Commandant of the Staff College, Camberley; 1898–1903	Succeeded by Sir Henry Rawlinson
Preceded by Sir William Nicholson	Quartermaster-General to the Forces; 1908–1912	Succeeded by Sir John Cowans
Government offices
Preceded by Sir Archibald Hunter	Governor of Gibraltar; 1913–1918	Succeeded by Sir Horace Smith-Dorrien
