= José María Martín Domingo =

Spanish musician

José María Martín Domingo (22 May 1889 – 16 July 1961) was a Spanish composer and musician from Menorca. He was a virtuoso cornet player.

== Early life and education ==
Martin Domingo was born in Mahón in 1887. His father, Cecil Martin, played the euphonium in a military band stationed on Menorca island. There, Jose Maria began learning music theory at age five.

At nine he entered San Bernardo boarding school in Madrid where he met the Master José Chacón (musician), who cared for the young student and continued with his training, recommending him to the tutelage of the trumpet professor, Tomas Coronel, at the Royal Conservatory. Emilio Vega, director of the Alabarderos band, educated him in the disciplines of counterpoint, fugue and composition.

== Career ==
At fourteen Domingo obtained a place as first musician in the Cazadores de Barbastro Battalion, stationed in Madrid. The following year he joined the Alabarderos Royal Corps Band as a cornet player.

He quickly acquired a reputation as a virtuoso and was frequently invited to the orchestras in the zarzuela and opera theaters.

Thomas Coronel introduced him to the Royal Theatre Orchestra, whose director, Ricardo Villa, on creating the Madrid Municipal Band, in 1909 granted him the position of first trumpet at the age of 22.

Master Villa, recognized Martin Domingo as a great Director and, in the absence of Miguel Yuste-Vice director, Jose Maria began to take the baton.

Martin Domingo began to form his own groups, which he directed in the San Isidro, Atocha and Hotel Nacional cafes, meeting and cultural centers of Madrid. He began to be famed not only as a director but also as a composer. He opened many pasodobles, polkas, waltzes, habaneras, mazurkas, etc... which were highly successful and popular.

In 1918 he managed to become an Army Major musician, stationed in Santa Cruz de Tenerife. There he directed public concerts with the military band, organized choirs, composed works such as the celebrated Ven, Cyrilla, Icod, pasodoble on canary grounds, El Desfile, El Coronel Mayorga, among others. At the request of Master Villa, he requested a transfer to the peninsula.

After Miguel Yuste died he left the army, becoming Vice director of the Madrid Municipal Band, where he served for over 30 years. He combined this with his work as composer, being the author of works such as Lagartijilla, Marcial, eres el más grande (dedicated to Marcial Lalanda) and Los Dos Adolfos.

He became friends with contemporary literature and art personages such as Carlos Arniches, Francisco de Cossio, Jacinto Guerrero, Federico Moreno Torroba, Mariano Benlliure and others.

== Recognition ==
In 1953 the Madrid City Council awarded him the Silver Medal of the City. Years before, the French Republic awarded him the city of Paris medal.
