= Cathedral Square, Gibraltar =

Square in Gibraltar

Cathedral Square
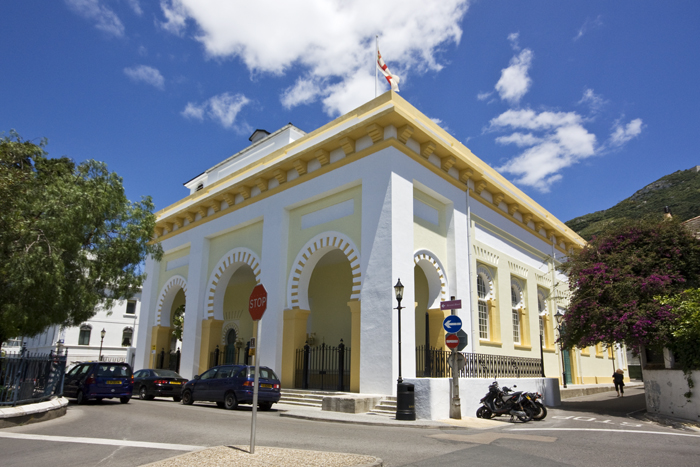
- View of the Cathedral of the Holy Trinity looking northeast (2010).
- Owner: Government of Gibraltar
- Location: Gibraltar
- Coordinates: 36.138304°N 5.353711°W

Cathedral Square is a square within the city centre of the British Overseas Territory of Gibraltar. It is the location of the Church of England Cathedral of the Holy Trinity which stands to the eastern end of the square. Other features at the square include Duke of Kent House home to the Gibraltar Tourist Board, the Bristol Hotel a children's play park and Sir Herbert Miles Promenade, which is a boulevard lined with nine cannon overlooking the harbour.

The open space here was once a street called Columbine Street which was named after lieutenant-general Francis Columbine who was a deputy governor. The Moorish looking Cathedral dates from 1839 when the Church of the Holy Trinity was redefined. It had been designed by a military engineer for John Pitt, 2nd Earl of Chatham as a church in 1825.
