= Hyacinthe Gaëtan de Lannion =

French politician (1719–1762)

Hyacinthe Gaëtan de Lannion (1719–1762) was a French politician and administrator. From 1735 to 1762 he was the Governor of Vannes in Brittany, a hereditary post he inherited from his father Anne de Lannion along with the title Count of Lannion. In 1756 following France's successful siege of the strategic British base of Minorca he was appointed Governor of Minorca a position he held until 1758 and then again between 1760 and 1762.

He was made a Knight of the Holy Spirit (2 February 1759) and promoted to lieutenant general of His Majesty's armies (17 December 1759). He died in 1762, and was succeeded in his title by Emmanuel Marie Louis de Noailles.

== See also ==
- List of governors of Menorca
- France in the Seven Years War

Military offices
Preceded by James O'Hara	Governor of Minorca; 1756–1758	Succeeded by Marquis de Frémeur
