= Bristol Hotel, Gibraltar =

Hotel in Gibraltar

Bristol Hotel
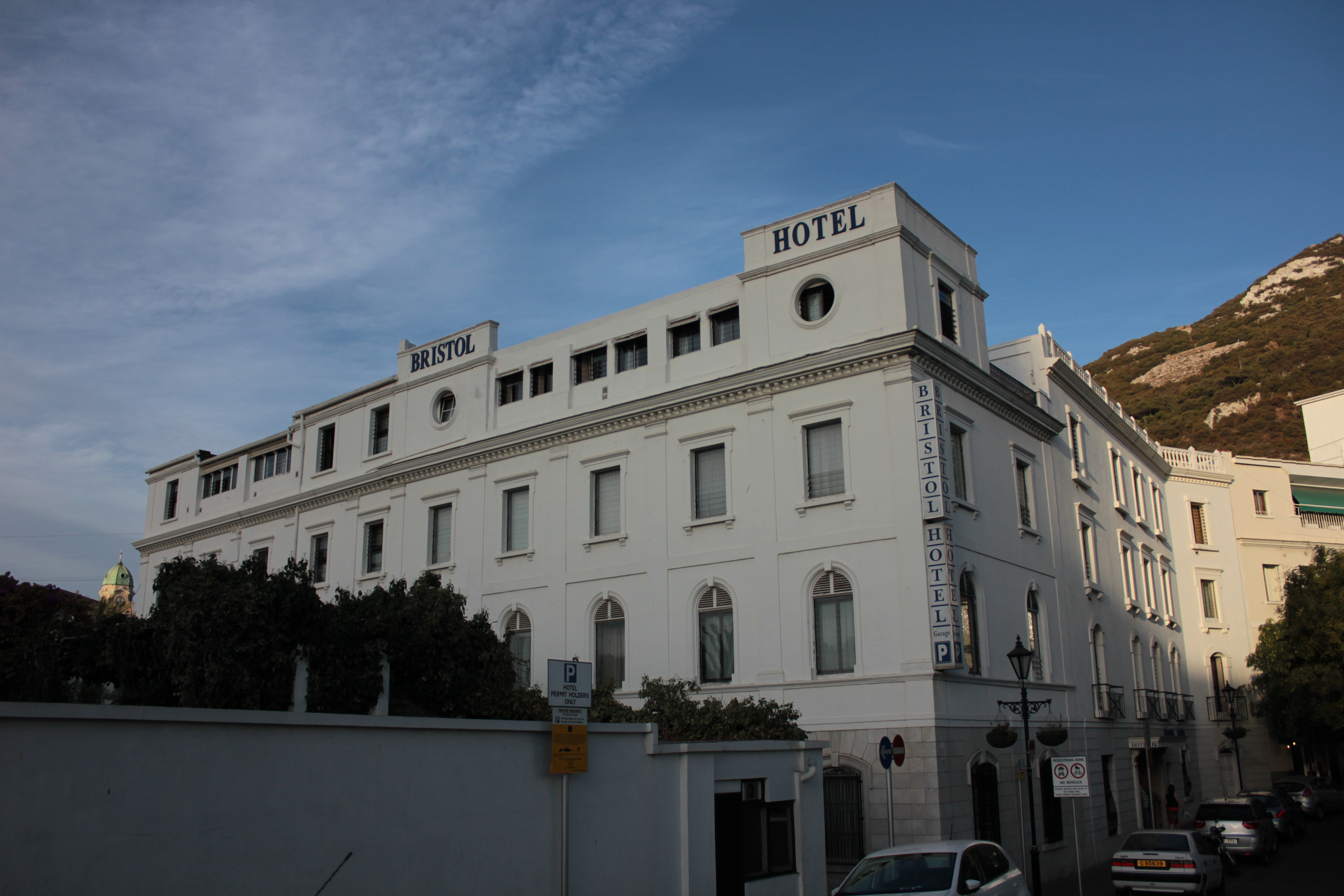

- Location within Gibraltar

General information
- Location: 10 Cathedral Square, Gibraltar
- Coordinates: 36°8′20″N 5°21′16″W

Other information
- Number of rooms: 60

Website
- www.bristolhotel.gi

Bristol Hotel is Gibraltar's oldest hotel. It is located on Cathedral Square in Gibraltar, next to the Church of England Cathedral of The Holy Trinity. Established in 1894 the 19th century, it occupies a white colonial building with swimming pool and garden, located to the south of Cathedral of St. Mary the Crowned, next to the Gibraltar Museum. The hotel has 60 rooms and includes a subtropical garden.

During World War II, it served as the headquarters of the Royal Air Force and of a squadron of British flying boats and served as a temporary residence for British officers in transit. It is one of many European hotels named Bristol, after the extensive travels of the wealthy Frederick Hervey, 4th Earl of Bristol.

== History ==
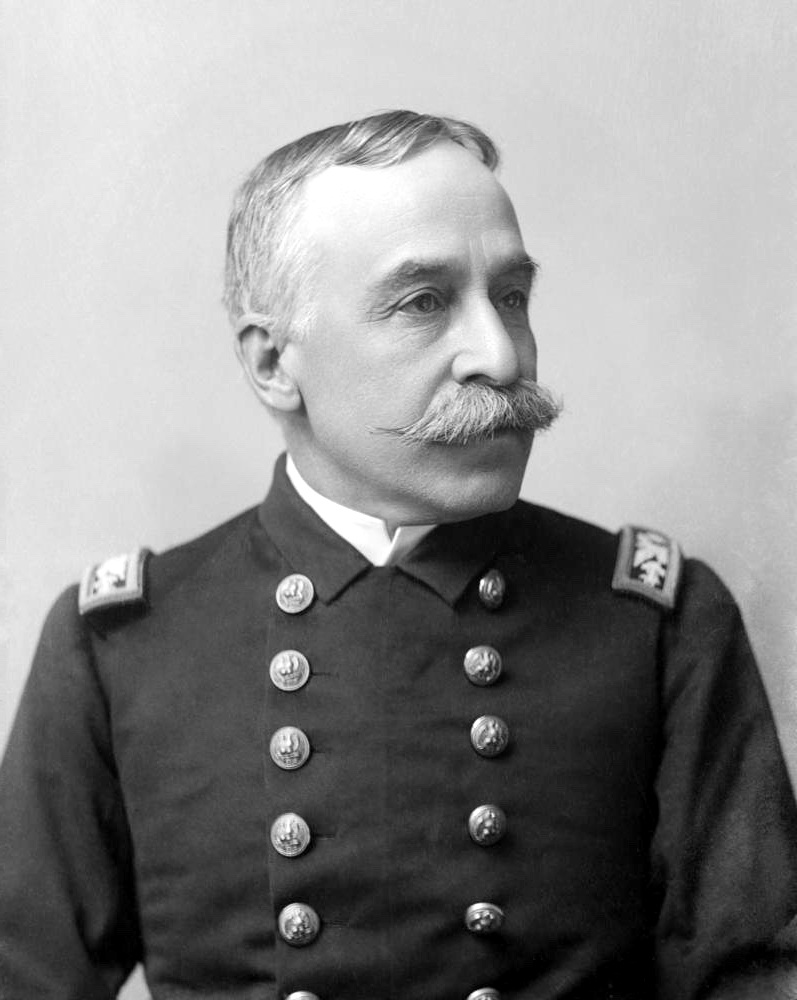
George Dewey was a guest before returning to the U.S. in 1899.

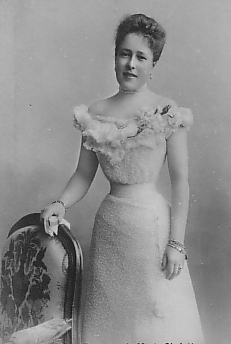
Princess Salm Salm was a guest while her husband was a prisoner of war.

The hotel was established in the 19th century and was named after Frederick Hervey, 4th Earl of Bristol, an extensive traveller of Europe. Prior to the opening of The Rock Hotel in 1932, it was regarded as Gibraltar's flagship hotel.

In September 1899, Admiral George Dewey, who led the United States Navy at the Battle of Manila Bay, stayed briefly at the hotel before his return to the United States later that month. The New York Times reported the following on 6 September 1899: "Admiral Dewey spent most of the day at the Hotel Bristol where he is living ashore, receiving a constant stream of visitors. He has declined all dinner and public invitations, as he is suffering from indigestion."

In 1915, Princess Salm Salm, the wife of a German prince and the eldest daughter of Archduke Friedrich, Duke of Teschen (commander of the Austro-Hungarian Army), lived at the hotel as a guest of the Queen of Spain. Her husband, Prince Emmanuel Salm, had been detained while hunting big game in Africa and was held as a prisoner of war in Gibraltar upon the outbreak of World War I. Princess Salm Salm left her five children in Austria to be close to her husband. According to some accounts, Princes Salm Salm was also considered a British prisoner in Gibraltar. In 1916, the prince and princess were released as part of a prisoner exchange negotiated by the King of Spain.

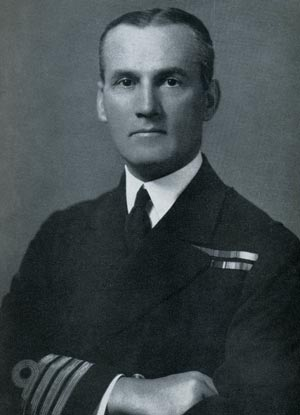
Kenneth Dewar reconciled with Admiral Collard at the Bristol after "The Royal Oak Mutiny".

In the spring of 1928, Rear Admiral Bernard Collard stayed at the Bristol during the court martial of Captain Kenneth Dewar after the notorious incident that the contemporary press dubbed "The Royal Oak Mutiny". Following the court martial, Dewar apologized to Collard in the dining room of the Bristol

In April 1920 The Prime Minister Lloyd George who had landed from the P&O liner Naldara, accompanied by Miss Lloyd George, Lord Riddel, Sir Maurice Hankey, Mr. Davies and Miss Stephenson had lunch at the Bristol Hotel.

In April 1931 Don Juan de Borbon Age 18, son of King Alfonso XIII of Spain, who was a student at the Naval School at San Fernando together with his professor Capitain de Corbeta Fernando Abarzuza, arrived in Gibraltar by Spanish torpedo boat No.16. Arriving at 8.00am. They stayed at the Bristol Hotel, where he remained until invited by the Governor to stay at Government House.

In September 1935, a recruiting drive was held at the hotel with the prospects increasing for war in East Africa arising out of the Abyssinia Crisis. The Second Italo-Abyssinian War broke out several days later with the Italian invasion of Abyssinia (now known as Ethiopia).

In October 1938, General John J. Pershing's 73-year-old cousin, Dr. Edward Hamilton Pershing, recovered at the hotel after contracting smallpox while traveling aboard the British ocean liner Strathmore.

During World War II, the Bristol Hotel was the headquarters of No. 200 Group of the RAF Coastal Command. Military officers in transit also utilised the hotel during the war, including some working for the SOE. The war conditions at the hotel were markedly different from the experience of those living in Great Britain as there was no blackout and steaks were on the menu.

The hotel declined after World War II; it had been met with competition from The Rock Hotel which had taken its status as Gibraltar's flagship hotel in 1932. In 1954, one visitor described their room as "roved to be a cheerless, bare place with an lithograph of Queen Victoria hanging on the wall and two camp beds". During the early 1960s, work was done on the hotel to add hot water. During the later part of the 1960s, the hotel improved the kitchen and pool by making both larger, and by working with and improving the garden club.

== Images ==
Bristol Hotel, Gibraltar

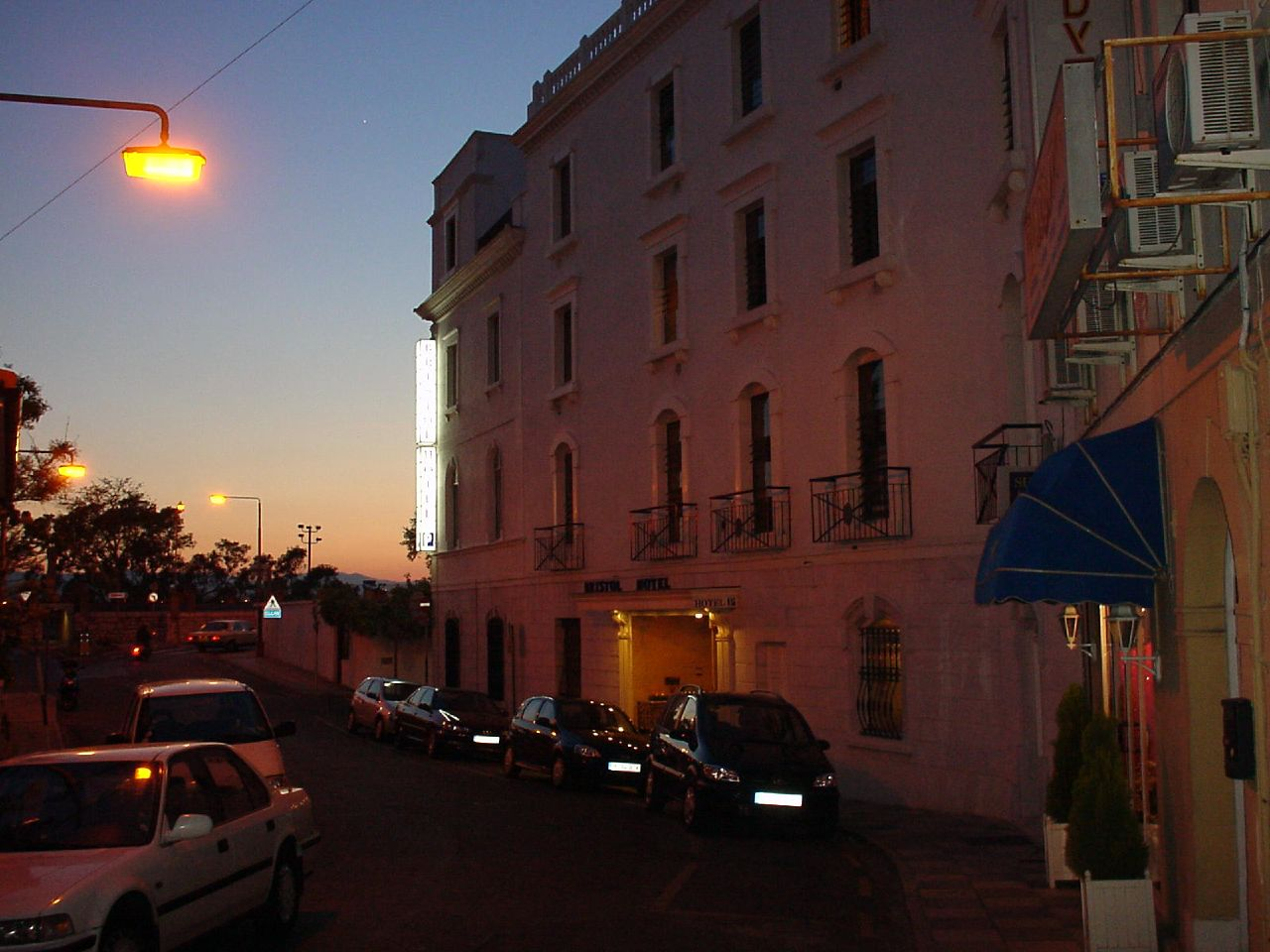
Bristol Hotel at dusk, 2002

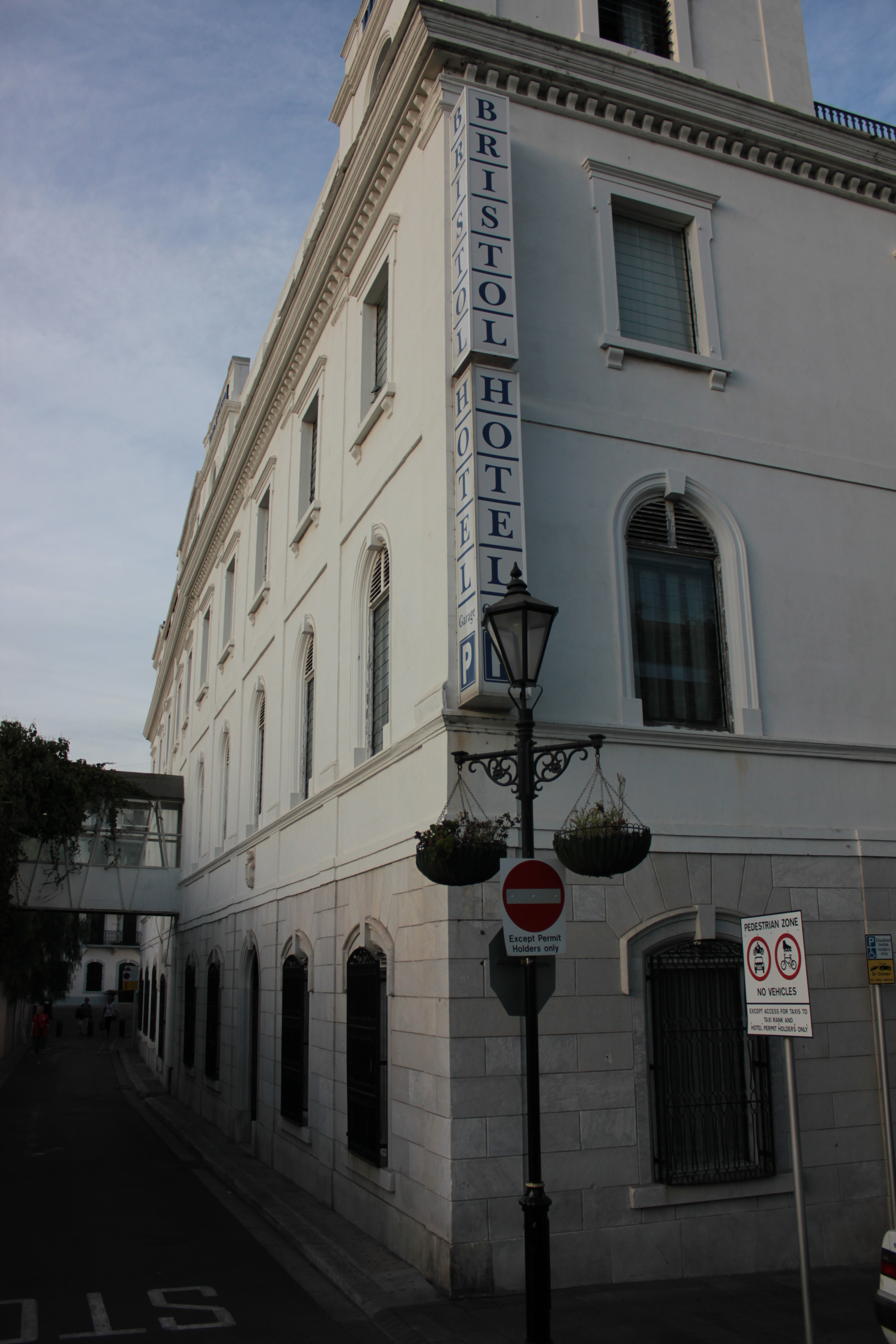
Bristol Hotel, September 2012

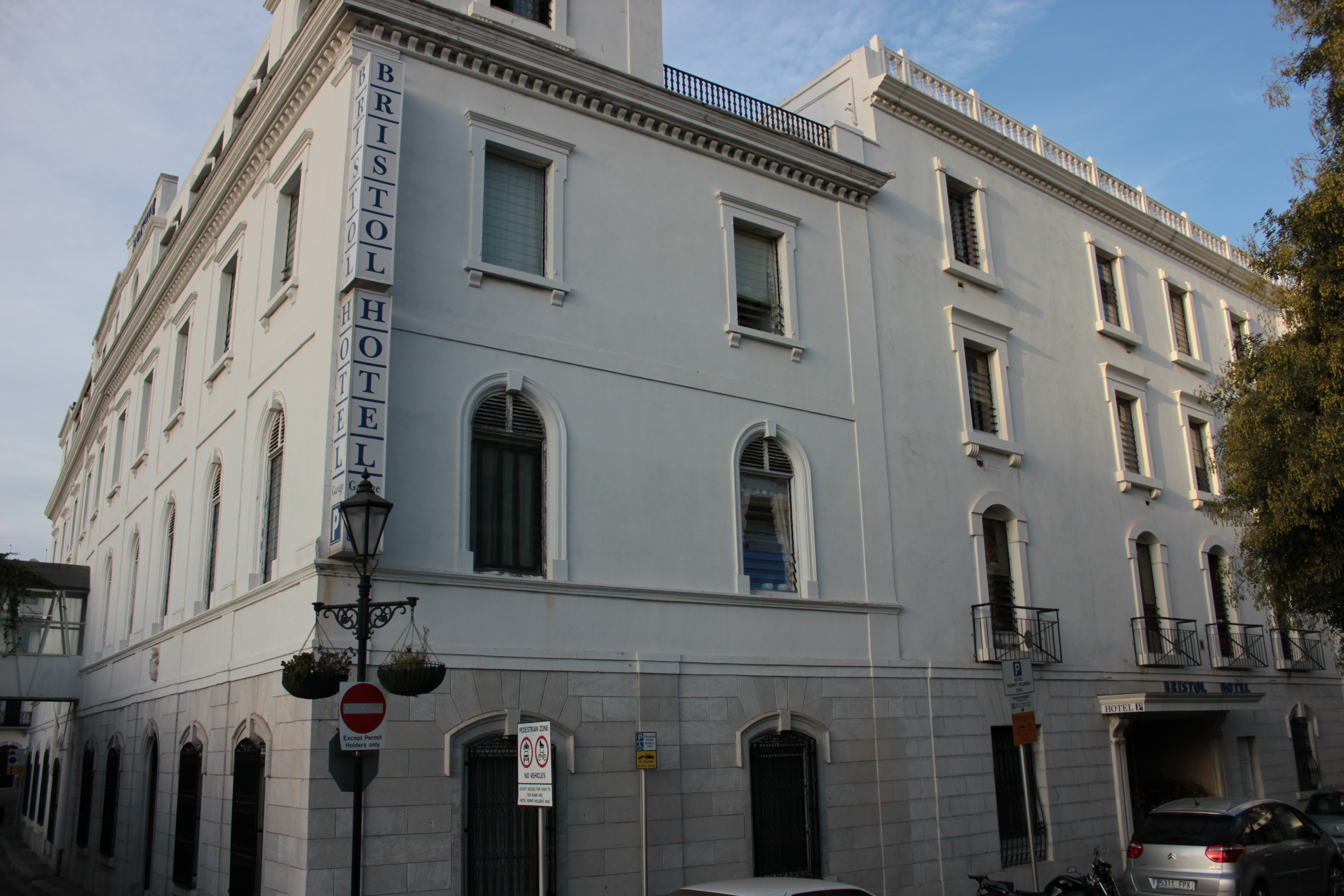
Bristol Hotel, September 2012

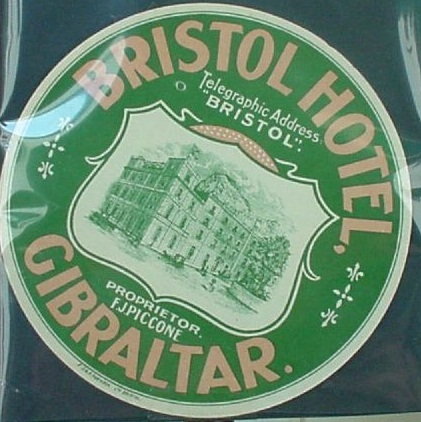
Early Bristol Hotel logo
