= Charles O'Hara, 1st Baron Tyrawley =

Irish soldier

Lieutenant-General The Right Honourable The Lord Tyrawley PC (Ire)
- Born: c. 1650; Kingdom of Ireland
- Died: 9 June 1724
- Military career
- Allegiance: Kingdom of England (pre-1707); Kingdom of Great Britain
- Branch: British Army
- Rank: Lieutenant-General
- Commands: Ireland
- Conflicts: War of the Spanish Succession

Lieutenant-General Charles O'Hara, 1st Baron Tyrawley (died 9 June 1724) was an Irish soldier known for his service with the British Army. From 1714 to 1721 he served as Commander-in-Chief of the Royal Irish Army.

== Background ==
Born in Ireland in the mid-seventeenth century, his exact origins are unclear, with some contemporaries claiming that he had once been a highwayman. He developed a connection with the powerful Butler family of County Tipperary, who frequently governed Ireland on the Crown's behalf. He was likely a riding master to the young James Butler, later Duke of Ormonde, although he later claimed to have been his tutor.

== Military career ==
O'Hara was commissioned into the Duke of York's Foot, becoming a Captain in 1678. In 1679, he transferred to the Anglo-Dutch Brigade and then, in 1686, he moved to the 1st Foot Guards. He became Lieutenant Colonel of that Regiment in 1689.

In 1703, during the War of Spanish Succession, he went to Cádiz; he distinguished himself at the Battle of Vigo Bay but was arrested for looting on return to England. Having been acquitted, in 1706, he became Second-in-Command in Spain and prevented a French attack on Guadalajara, earning an Irish Barony as a reward. In 1707, at the Battle of Almansa, he commanded the left flank of the Army.

Following the Hanoverian Succession of 1714, he was appointed Commander-in-Chief, Ireland, a post he held until 1721.

== Family ==
He married Frances Rouse and together they went on to have at least one son, James O'Hara, who became a field marshal, and one daughter.

== Bibliography ==
- Hugill, J.A.C. No Peace Without Spain. Kensal Press, 1991.

Military offices
Preceded by Edward Fitzpatrick	Colonel of The Ordnance Regiment; 1696–1713	Succeeded by Hon. James O'Hara
Preceded by William Steuart	Commander-in-Chief, Ireland; 1714–1721	Succeeded by Viscount Shannon
Peerage of Ireland
New creation	Baron Tyrawley; 1706–1724	Succeeded by James O'Hara
