= John Mostyn (British Army officer) =

British Army general

General John Mostyn
- Born: c. 1709
- Died: 16 February 1779
- Military career
- Allegiance: Kingdom of Great Britain
- Branch: British Army
- Rank: General

General John Mostyn (c. 1709 – 16 February 1779) was a British soldier, MP and colonial administrator.

He was a younger son of Sir Roger Mostyn, 3rd Baronet and educated at Westminster School and Christ Church, Oxford.

He joined the army as an ensign in 1733. On 2 September 1743, he was promoted from captain in the 31st Regiment of Foot to captain-lieutenant in the 2nd Regiment of Foot Guards. On 2 April 1745, he was promoted to captain of a company, and was wounded the next month at the Battle of Fontenoy. He served as Groom of the Bedchamber to King George II from 1746 to his death. From 1751 to 1754 he held the colonelcy of the 7th Regiment of Foot (Royal Fuzileers), from 1754 to 1758 that of the 13th Regiment of Dragoons, from 1758 to 1760 that of the 5th (or Royal Irish) Regiment of Dragoons, from 1760 to 1763 that of the 7th (The Queens Own) Regiment of Dragoons and from 1763 to 1779 that of the 1st King's Dragoon Guards. He was promoted to the rank of general in 1772.

Mostyn served as Governor of Menorca for a ten-year period between 1768 and 1778. It was an appointment in name only, and Mostyn was not in residence on the island, which meant that his deputy was in effective charge – from 1774 this was James Murray, his eventual successor who was forced to surrender the island in 1782 to a Spanish force.

He died unmarried.

== See also ==
- List of governors of Menorca

== Sources ==
- John Brooke, MOSTYN, John (1709–79). in The History of Parliament: the House of Commons 1754–1790 (1964).

Parliament of Great Britain
| Preceded by Henry Finch; Lord James Cavendish | Member of Parliament for Malton; 1741–1768; With: Henry Finch 1741–61; Savile Finch 1761–68 | Succeeded by Savile Finch; The Viscount Downe |
Military offices
| Preceded by William Hargrave | Colonel of the 7th Regiment of Foot (Royal Fuzileers); 1751–1754 | Succeeded by Lord Robert Bertie |
| Preceded by Hon. Henry Seymour Conway | Colonel of the 13th Regiment of Dragoons; 1754–1758 | Succeeded by Archibald Douglas |
| Preceded by The Viscount Molesworth | Colonel of the 5th (or Royal Irish) Regiment of Dragoons; 1758–1760 | Succeeded by Hon. Joseph Yorke |
| Preceded by Sir John Cope | Colonel of the 7th (The Queen's Own) Regiment of Dragoons; 1760–1763 | Succeeded by Sir George Howard |
| Preceded by Humphrey Bland | Colonel of the 1st (The King's) Dragoon Guards; 1763–1779 | Succeeded by Sir George Howard |
| Preceded by Sir George Howard | Governor of Menorca; 1768–1778 | Succeeded by James Murray |
