= Flag of the governor of Gibraltar =

Standard of the governor of Gibraltar

The flag of the governor of Gibraltar is the official standard of the governor of Gibraltar which is flown over buildings, vehicles and vessels to signify the presence of the governor. The current flag has been in use since 1999.

== Design ==
The design follows the basic pattern used by the flags of other British governors of overseas territories. It consists of the Union Flag which is defaced with a segment of the coat of arms of Gibraltar. This is surrounded by a gold ring and a laurel wreath.

== Previous versions ==
- The gold ring in previous standards of the governor is absent
Flag of the governor of Gibraltar (1875–1939)

Flag of the governor of Gibraltar (1939–1982)

Flag of the governor of Gibraltar (1982–1999)

== See also ==
List of flags of Gibraltar
