= Pasqual Calbó i Caldés =

Spanish painter and writer (1752–1817)

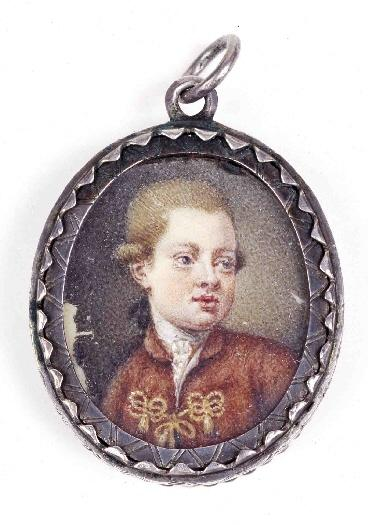
- Self-portrait, oil in ivory, display in Museu de Menorca
- Born: 24 October 1752; Mahón, Menorca, Balearic Islands, Spain
- Died: 12 April 1817 (aged 64); Mahón, Menorca, Balearic Islands, Spain
- Occupation: Painter
- Movement: Enlightenment

Pasqual Calbó Caldés (24 October 1752 – 12 April 1817) was a Spanish painter, finding in Menorca inspiration for his work, as the island had cultural diversity following a successful British invasion.

His affinity for Menorca led him to reduce his economic ambition, and his circumstances required he change his career as a painter, instead beginning work as a teacher of geometry, architecture and physics.

== Family and youth ==
Pasqual was the youngest of the four children of the Calbó – Caldés family. His siblings Juan, Vicenta and Antonia were born in 1744, 1747 and 1749 respectively. Although the exact date of the wedding of his parents is unknown, it is known that his father was born in Aragón and worked in the maritime business, which was a career followed by his eldest son Juan, and his mother, Anna María Caldés Orfila, who was born in 1723 in Menorca.

The Calbó family lived in 15 s'Arravaleta Street (presently number 27). Despite their limited economic resources, the family allowed their son, apart from attending school, to frequently take drawing and painting lessons in an academy run by the Italian artist Giuseppe Chiesa in Mahón. Through this, Calbó began to paint early in life. He stood out among his peers, and Chiesa suggested his parents allow him to move to Italy to develop his artistic ability.

== Calbó and Menorca ==
Calbó returned to his home city, Mahón, when he was 28. Even though there is no direct evidence, it is thought that Calbó visited and kept in touch with Chiesa. During the next 7 years, after which he travelled again, he taught and produced many works of art, mostly portraits; these include the one depicting his family and the portrait of count Cifuentes, which was commissioned by the University of Mahón in 1783.

== Trip to America and return to Menorca ==
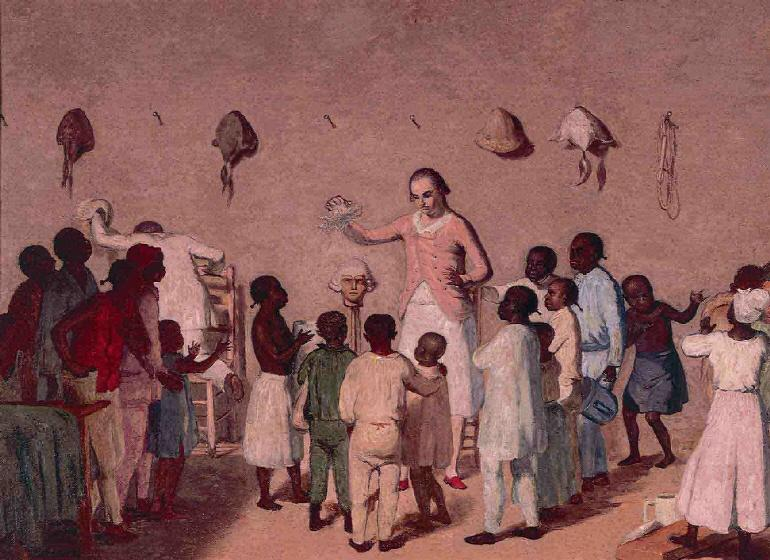
The seller of wigs in Santo Domingo, oil on copper, 36 x 46 cm, Museo de Menorca.

In the summer of 1787, Pasqual Calbó settled down in America, where he became a landscaper. Early on, after drawing the city and its fortifications, he was detained and taken as a spy, leading to a meeting with the governor and an order for his arrest. He was released two days later, following the mediation of the captain of his ship. After his release, he applied for a residential permit to stay as a painter, which was denied. Then, he traveled to New Orleans, where it is not known whether he stayed. Either way, it is known that he moved to Santo Domingo at the service of the king of France. In this period he painted "Dance of black people" and "Hairdressers of blacks".

In 1790 he went back to Menorca for the rest of his life, where he again worked in both painting and teaching. Here, he drew a series of drawings depicting the main professions of the period (such as shellfish catchers, farmers and stonecutters). He also gathered several treatises dedicated to his students, which included texts written by him in Catalan language accompanied with drawings.

In 1812, after an intense career, he had a paralysis in both hands, which required him to stop painting. Five years later, he died in his home at age 65 and was buried in the family pantheon of the old Catholic Cemetery of Mahón.

== Work ==
His artistic career has not been widely recognised. Regarding his paintings and drawings, his main influence was his master Chiesa. During his stay in Rome, he became an admirer of Mengs, being influenced by his work, as depicted in one of his most famous paintings, Parnaso de Villa Albani (1779) and the wall paintings of Hall of the Papyri in the Vatican Library. Three main topics can be spotted in his work:

=== Religious paintings ===
There are two sketches for the decoration of an arch depicting the Theological virtues and an altarpiece for the private chapel at s'Aranjaça, currently located in Ateneo de Mahón.

=== Landscapes ===
Few landscape pieces are preserved, but the existing ones tend to imitate nature in a faithful manner. However, there are many dull colour-schemes and gray tonalities. The use of green colours, cloudy backgrounds and illuminated human figures make his work and that of Michele Pagano somewhat similar.

=== Portraits ===
His artistic ability is shown in portraits, which are among his most recognised work, both official portraits and private ones.

== Important dates ==
From 1770 to 1774: He attended the Academy of Fine Arts of Venice.

1774: He was appointed pensionary of her Imperial Highness Maria Theresa of Spain.

From 1774 to 1778: He studied in the French Academy in Rome.

1778: He traveled to Vienna.

1779: He was appointed as the artist of the court of Vienna in the Imperial Gallery of Belvedere. In this same year he started to work in the same gallery.

1780: He returned to his home city of Mahón.

1787: His health worsened and his melancholy intensified, making him travel to La Habana.

1790: Calbó leaves America and settles down in Menorca until his death.

After his death:

1866: He was designated an Illustrious son by the city council of Mahón. His portrait was placed in the session room of the town hall.

1912: A copy of his portrait (painted by Francesc Hernández Sanz) was placed in the gallery of illustrious Menorcans in the Town Hall of Mahon.
