= Baron Tyrawley =

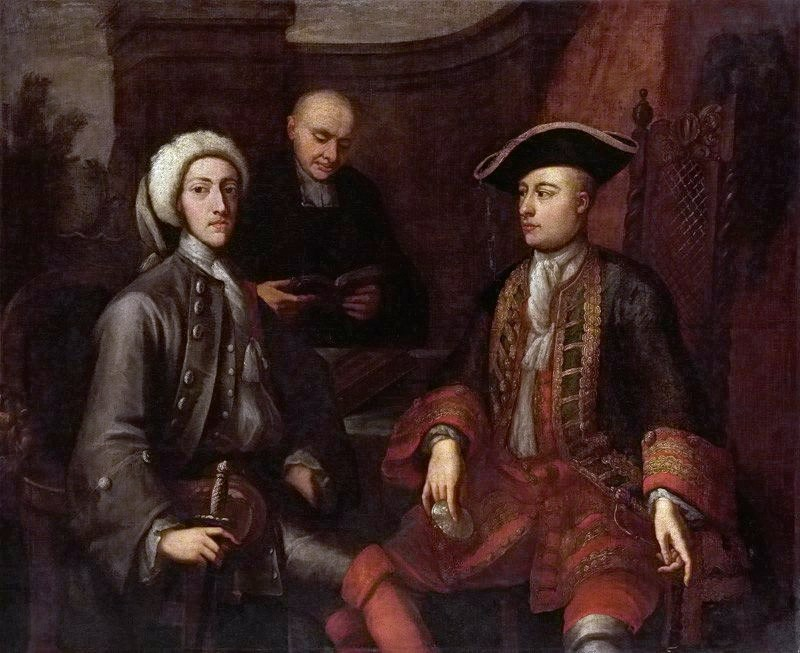
James O'Hara (1682-1774), 2nd Baron Tyrawley, Baron Kilmaine (right); he is sitting with the Duke of Montague (left).

Baron Tyrawley was a title in the Peerage of Ireland that was created twice. The first creation came in 1706 in favour of the soldier Sir Charles O'Hara. His son, James O'Hara, was a distinguished military commander, who had already been created Baron Kilmaine in the Peerage of Ireland in 1722 when he succeeded his father in that of Tyrawley two years later. Both titles became extinct on his death in 1774.

The second creation came in 1797, in favour of James Cuffe, who was created Baron Tyrawley, of Ballinrobe in the County of Mayo. He sat in the House of Lords from 1800 to 1821 as one of the 28 original Irish representative peers. However, on his death in 1821 this title became extinct as well.

The Barony of Tyrawley is an area in northeast County Mayo.

== Barons Tyrawley; First Creation (1706) ==
- Charles O'Hara, 1st Baron Tyrawley (c. 1640–1724)
- James O'Hara, 2nd Baron Tyrawley (died 1774) (created Baron Kilmaine in 1722)

== Barons Tyrawley; Second Creation (1797) ==
- James Cuffe, 1st Baron Tyrawley (1748–1821)

== See also ==
- Baron Kilmaine
