= Edward Fitzpatrick (died 1696) =

- Died: 10 November 1696; At sea
- Military career
- Allegiance: Kingdom of England
- Branch: (Kingdom of England) English Army
- Rank: Brigadier-General
- Conflicts: Williamite War in Ireland

Brigadier-General Edward Fitzpatrick (died 10 November 1696) was an English Army officer who became colonel of the Ordnance Regiment.

== Military career ==
Born the son of Andrew Fitzpatrick of Castlefleming and Ellice (daughter of Richard Butler, 3rd Viscount Mountgarret), Fitzpatrick was given command of a regiment under King William III and saw action during the Williamite War in Ireland. He became colonel of the Ordnance Regiment on 1 August 1692. Promoted to brigadier-general on 24 October 1694, he died when travelling by sea on the Holyhead Packet Ship to Ireland on 10 November 1696.

== Sources ==
- Carrigan, William (1905). The History and Antiquities of the Diocese of Ossory. Sealy, Bryers & Walker. ISBN 9785879206463.
- D'Alton, John (1689). King James's Irish Army List. John D'Alton. ISBN 9780940134232.

Military offices
Preceded by The Earl of Orkney	Colonel of The Ordnance Regiment; 1692–1696	Succeeded by Lord Tyrawley
