= Siege of Fort St Philip (1756) =

1756 siege of the Seven Years' War

- Part of the Seven Years' War
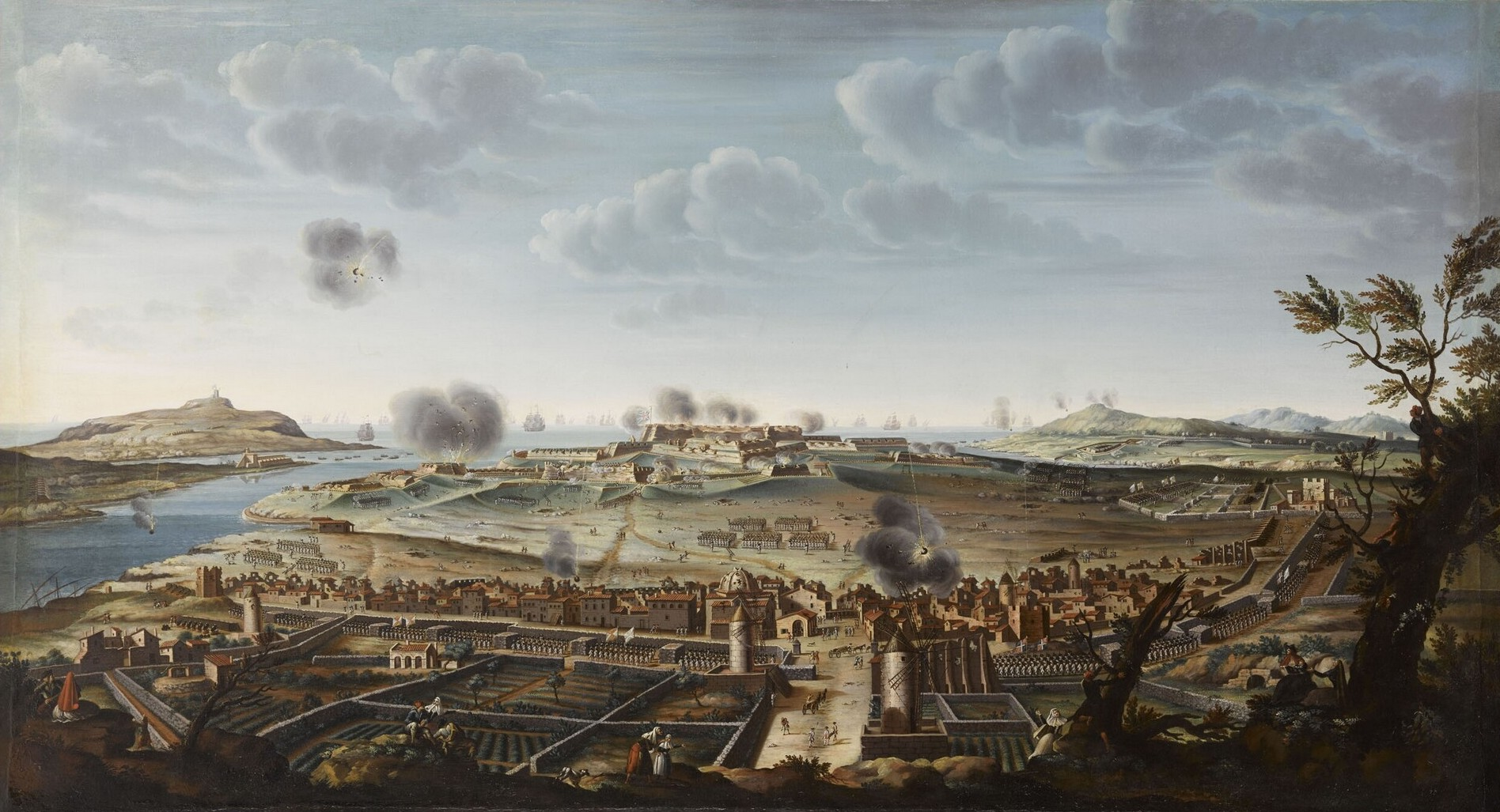
- Painting of the siege by Jean-Baptiste Martin the Younger
Date	20 April to 29 June 1756
Location	Fort St Phillip, Menorca 39°51′54″N 04°18′18″E
Result	French victory

Belligerents
France	Great Britain

Commanders and leaders
Duke of Richelieu; Galissonière	William Blakeney (surrendered)

Strength
16,000	2,860

Casualties and losses
1,600 killed or died from disease 2,000 sick or wounded	59 killed 2,801 captured

The siege of Fort St Philip, also known as the siege of Minorca, took place from 20 April to 29 June 1756 during the Seven Years' War. Ceded to Great Britain in 1714 by Spain following the War of the Spanish Succession, its capture by France threatened the British naval position in the Western Mediterranean and it was returned after the Treaty of Paris (1763).

== Background ==
The Spanish island of Menorca was captured by the British in 1708 during the War of the Spanish Succession and along with Gibraltar ceded to Great Britain under the 1714 Treaty of Utrecht. Although considered vital for control of the Western Mediterranean, it was also extremely vulnerable, since the Spanish deeply resented British occupation, while it was only two days sail from Cádiz, and one from the French naval base at Toulon. Attempts by William Blakeney, Lieutenant governor of Menorca and commander of the garrison of Fort St Phillip, to reduce local opposition by encouraging his troops to marry local women, and controlling Catholic schools and institutions proved unsuccessful.

A Parliamentary committee later set up to investigate the island's loss noted the poor state of its defences, with crumbling walls and rotten gun platforms, while over 35 senior officers were absent from their posts, including the governor of Fort St Phillip, and the colonels of all four regiments in its garrison. In addition, while Blakeney had a long and distinguished military career, by 1756 he was over 80 years old and suffering from alcoholism.

Aware of the island's vulnerability, the French hoped its capture would provide them with a bargaining chip to persuade Ferdinand VI of Spain to join the war as their ally. In the event this proved not to be the case, as Ferdinand remained neutral until his death in 1759. Although the Seven Years' War did not formally begin until France declared war on Britain on 9 June 1756, at the beginning of the year Jean-Baptiste de Machault d'Arnouville, then head of the French naval ministry, ordered Louis François Armand de Vignerot du Plessis, 3rd Duke of Richelieu to prepare an expeditionary force to take the island.

== Siege ==
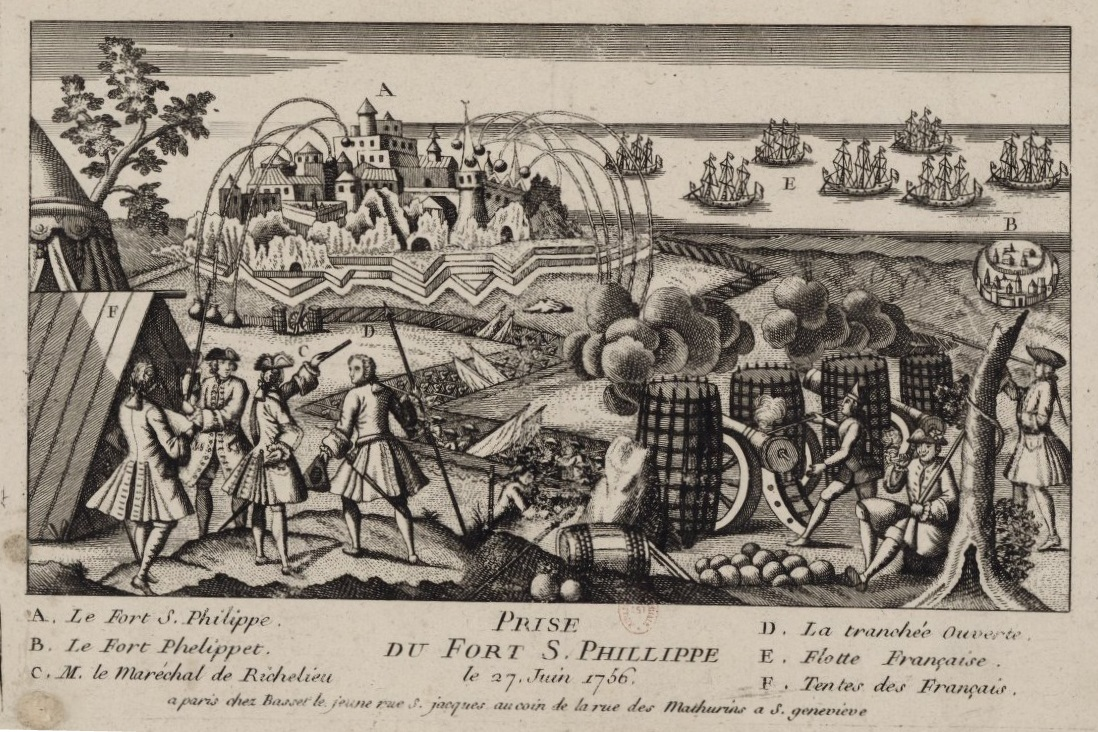
Depiction of the siege

Richelieu sailed from Marseille on 10 April with transports carrying 16,000 troops and escorted by seventeen naval vessels; he reached Menorca on 18 April, occupied most of the island and then on 8 May began to bombard Fort St Phillip. Informed of Richelieu's preparations in mid March, Blakeney had substantially strengthened his fortifications but the presence of numerous non-combatants, including over 800 women and children, meant the garrison would quickly run short of supplies.

A squadron of the Royal Navy from Gibraltar under Admiral John Byng attempted to relieve the fort but withdrew after the largely indecisive Battle of Minorca on 20 May. Although the engagement has been described as a "minor cannonade", his retreat effectively sealed the fate of the garrison, and Blakeney surrendered on 29 June, two days after the besiegers captured several important outworks.

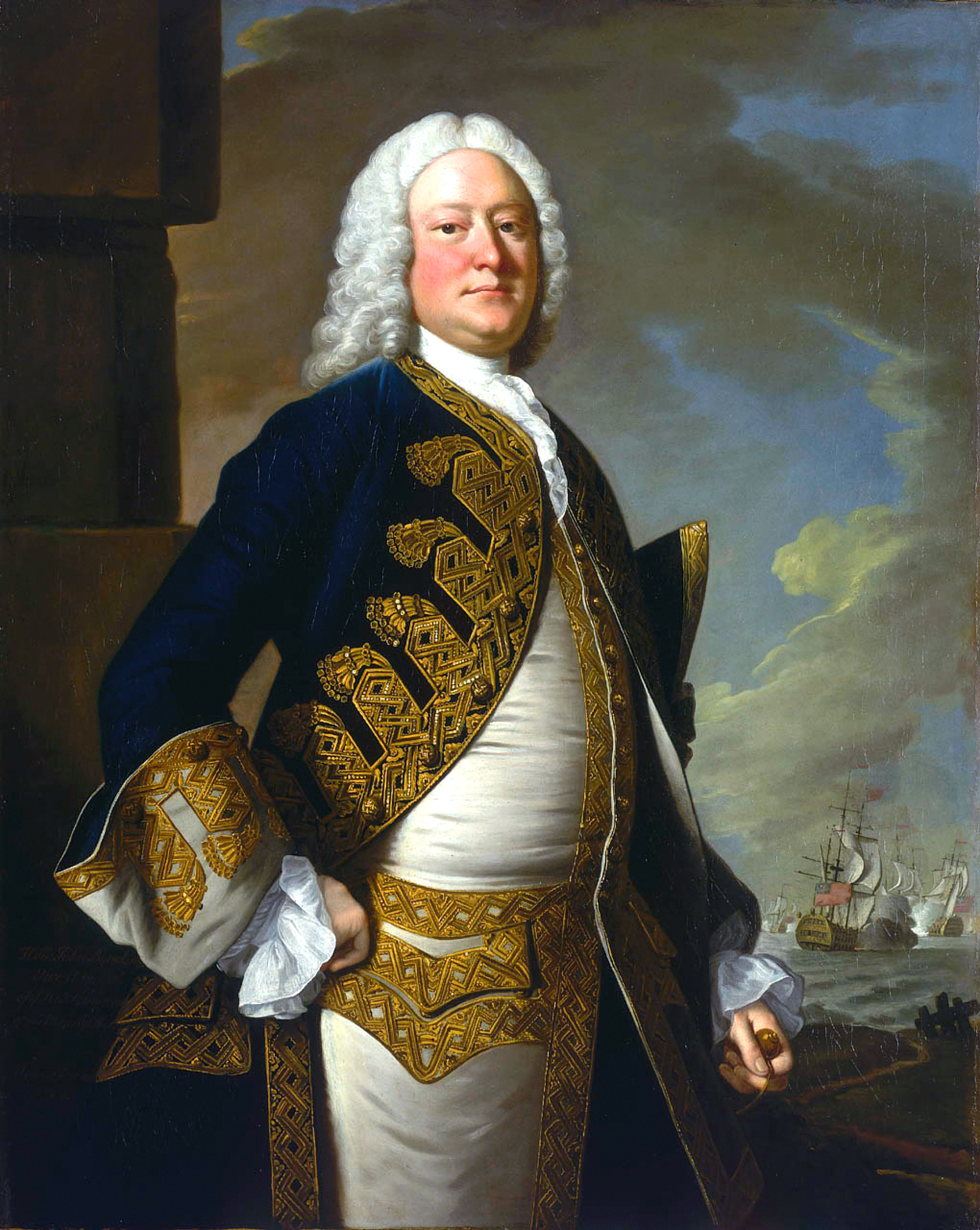
Portrait of Admiral Byng by Thomas Hudson. Byng was executed in March 1757 for his failure to relieve Minorca.

During the siege, the British garrison lost 59 killed and 149 wounded, French casualties amounting to some 1,600 dead and 2,000 wounded. Since Blakeney surrendered on terms, the surviving members of the garrison along with British civilians from the local administration, a total of 4,378 in all, were transported to Gibraltar in French ships, arriving there on 11 July. In the inquiry that followed, Byng was condemned of failing "to do his utmost" and executed in March 1757 despite pleas for leniency, prompting French author Voltaire to later write that the English "shoot an admiral from time to time, to encourage the others". Thomas Fowke, Governor of Gibraltar, previously court-martialled but acquitted for his role in the 1746 defeat at Prestonpans, was also found guilty of not sending reinforcements early enough and dismissed.

In contrast, the popular press portrayed Blakeney as a hero, the heavy drinking that left him with "a paralytick disorder" and "nervous tremors" being portrayed as the virtues of a simple soldier. His professional colleagues were far more critical; William Cunninghame, his chief engineer and deputy, strongly objected to the surrender, which he considered premature, and listed numerous deficiencies in the conduct of the defence.

== Aftermath ==
Hyacinthe Gaëtan de Lannion was appointed the first French Governor of Menorca. A British naval squadron led by Sir Edward Hawke sent out to replace Byng, arrived off Menorca shortly after the surrender. As Hawke did not have enough troops on board to land and mount a siege to retake the island he departed, cruising in the waters off Marseilles for three months before sailing home. He was later criticised for failing to mount a blockade of the island, which might have forced it to surrender through starvation.

The French held Menorca until the Treaty of Paris (1763), when Britain exchanged it for the island of Guadeloupe. The Spanish recaptured Menorca in 1781 during the 1779 to 1783 Anglo-Spanish War and it was formally returned to them by Britain in the Treaty of Paris (1783).

== Order of battle ==
=== British Army ===
Land forces which formed part of the garrison included:

- 4th (The King's Own) Regiment of Foot
- 7th Regiment of Foot (Royal Fusiliers)
- 23rd Regiment of Foot (Royal Welch Fusiliers)
- 24th Regiment of Foot
- 34th Regiment of Foot

=== French Army ===
The French invasion force consisted of:

- 1st Battalion of the Cambis Regiment (2nd Battalion later joined the siege after originally being garrisoned in Monaco)
- 1st and 2nd Battalions of the Vermandois Regiment
- 1st and 2nd Battalions of the Rohan Regiment
- 1st and 2nd Battalions of the Médoc Regiment
- 1st and 2nd Battalions of the Royal Regiment
- 1st and 2nd Battalions of the Brittany Regiment
- 1st and 2nd Battalions of the Haynault Regiment
- 1st and 2nd Battalions of the Talaru Regiment
- 1st and 2nd Battalions of the Briqueville Regiment
- 1st and 2nd Battalions of the Marine Regiment
- 1st Battalion of the La Mark Regiment
- 1st Battalion of the Royal Italian Regiment
- 1st Battalion of the Soissonnais Regiment
- 1st Battalion of the Royal Artillery
- 1 company of Miners
- 1 company of Workers

Arriving later as reinforcements:

- 1st and 2nd Battalions of the Traisnel Regiment (arrived on 15 May)
- 1st and 2nd Battalions of the Nice Regiment (arrived on 21 May)

== Sources ==
- Debrett (1792). History, Debates & Proceedings of Parliament 1743-1774; Volume III. Debrett.
- Donaldson, David Whalom (1994). Britain and Menorca in the 18th century; Volume 3. Open University.
- Gregory, David Whalom (1990). Minorca, the Illusory Prize; A History of the British Occupations of Minorca Between 1708 and 1802. Fairleigh Dickinson University Press. ISBN 978-0838633892.
- Harding, Richard (2008). "Blakeney, William, Baron Blakeney". Oxford Dictionary of National Biography (online ed.). Oxford University Press. doi:10.1093/ref:odnb/2591. (Subscription, Wikipedia Library access or UK public library membership required.)
- McGuffie, T. H. (1950). "The Defence of Minorca 1756". Journal of the Society for Army Historical Research. 28 (115).
- McGuffie, T. H. (1951). "Some fresh light on the siege of Minorca, 1756". History Today. 1 (10).
- Pajol, Charles Pierre Victor (1888). Les guerres sous Louis XV, vol. IV (in French). Firmin Didot frères, fils et Cie.
- Pope, Dudley (1962). At 12 Mr Byng was shot (1987 ed.). Martin Secker & Warburg Ltd. ISBN 978-0436377495.
- Regan, Geoffrey (2000). Brassey's Book of Naval Blunders. Brassey's. ISBN 978-1574882537.
- Royle, Trevor (2016). Culloden; Scotland's Last Battle and the Forging of the British Empire. Little, Brown. ISBN 978-1408704011.
- Susane, Louis (1874). Historie de la Cavalerie Français (in French). J. Hetzel et Cie.
- Susane, Louis (1851). Historie de L'Ancienne Infanterie Français (in French). J. Corréard.
- Susane, Louis (1876). Historie de L'Artillerie Français (in French). J. Hetzel et Cie.
- Vergé-Franceschi, Michel, ed. (2002). Dictionnaire d'histoire maritime - H-Z, Volume II (in French). éditions Robert Laffont, coll. « Bouquins ». ISBN 978-2221097441.
- Ward, Sir Adolphus William (1907). The Cambridge Modern History, Volume VI. Cambridge University Press.

== Bibliography ==
- Anderson, Fred (2000). Crucible of War: The Seven Years' War and the Fate of Empire in British North America, 1754-1766. Faber and Faber.
- Browning, Reed (1975). The Duke of Newcastle. Yale University Press.
- Longmate, Norman (1993). Island Fortress: The Defence of Great Britain, 1603-1945. HarperCollins.
- McLynn, Frank (2005). 1759: The Year Britain Became Master of the World. Pimlico.
- Rodger, N. A. M. (2006). Command of the Ocean: A Naval History of Britain, 1649-1815. Penguin Books.
- Simms, Brendan (2008). Three Victories and a Defeat: The Rise and Fall of the First British Empire. Penguin Books.
