= James O'Hara, 2nd Baron Tyrawley =

British army officer

The Right Honourable The Lord Tyrawley PC
- Born: 1682; Ireland
- Died: 14 July 1774 (aged 91 or 92); Twickenham, London
- Burial place: Royal Hospital Chelsea
- Military career
- Allegiance: England; Great Britain
- Branch: English Army; British Army
- Service years: 1703–1773
- Rank: Field Marshal
- Conflicts: War of the Spanish Succession; Seven Years' War

Field Marshal James O'Hara, 2nd Baron Tyrawley and 1st Baron Kilmaine, PC (1682 – 14 July 1774) was a British army officer. After serving as a junior officer in Spain and the Low Countries during the War of the Spanish Succession, he went on to become British ambassador to Lisbon establishing a close relationship with King John V there. He undertook a tour as British ambassador to Saint Petersburg before becoming Governor of Gibraltar where he set about improving the fortifications. He was briefly commander of British troops in Portugal during the Seven Years' War but was replaced within a few months. During his military career, he was colonel of eight different regiments.

== Military career ==
The Siege of Barcelona, where Lord Tyrawley and Kilmaine first saw action

Born the son of Charles O'Hara, 1st Baron Tyrawley, and Frances O'Hara (née Rouse), James O'Hara was commissioned as a lieutenant in the Royal Fusiliers on 15 March 1703. He was promoted to captain on 24 March 1705.

O'Hara fought at the Siege of Barcelona in April 1706 and was wounded at the Battle of Almansa in April 1707 during the War of the Spanish Succession. He was redeployed to the Low Countries as aide-de-camp to the Duke of Marlborough and was wounded again at the Battle of Malplaquet in September 1709. He succeeded his father as colonel of the Royal Fusiliers in January 1713 and then served with his regiment in Minorca for several years. For this he was appointed an aide-de-camp to the King in 1717 and, while serving in Ireland, was created Baron Kilmaine in the Peerage of Ireland on 2 January 1722. He succeeded his father as 2nd Baron Tyrawley in June 1724.

Lord Tyrawley and Kilmaine (as he was now) was appointed British ambassador to Lisbon in January 1727 establishing a close relationship with King John V there. Promoted to brigadier-general on 18 December 1735 and to major-general on 17 July 1739, he also became colonel of the 5th Regiment of Horse in August 1739. After retiring from his post in Lisbon in January 1741, he declined an American command later that year. Promoted to lieutenant-general on 5 April 1743, he became colonel of the 2nd Troop Horse Grenadier Guards later that month and was appointed British ambassador to Saint Petersburg in November 1743. He retired from the Saint Petersburg post in February 1745.

Lord Tyrawley became colonel of the 3rd Troop of Horse Guards in April 1745 and colonel of the Lord Tyrawley's Regiment in December 1746 before becoming Governor of Minorca in 1747. He was elected Fellow of the Royal Society in January 1748. He went on to become colonel of the 14th Regiment of Dragoons in July 1749, colonel of the 3rd (King's Own) Regiment of Dragoons in July 1752 and colonel of the Coldstream Guards in April 1755.

Tyrawley became Governor of Gibraltar in 1756 and set about improving the fortifications. These changes came under criticism from William Skinner who was British Chief Engineer. The two of them were called before the bar of the House of Commons where Lord Tyrawley harangued Skinner who took the anger in good humour. Tyrawley went on to be Governor of Portsmouth in 1759.

Promoted to full general on 14 March 1761, Lord Tyrawley and Kilmaine returned to Lisbon as British ambassador and commander of British troops in February 1762 for the duration of the Seven Years' War but was replaced by General John Burgoyne in July 1762 and returned to England in protest. Promoted to field marshal on 10 June 1763, he moved to Milbourne House in Barnes in 1770. He died at Twickenham on 14 July 1774 and was buried in the chapel of the Royal Hospital Chelsea.

== Family ==
In November 1724, Lord Tyrawley and Kilmaine married Mary Stewart, daughter of The 2nd Viscount Mountjoy. He had no children by this marriage but had at least two illegitimate children including Charles O'Hara, who followed him into the Army, and George Anne Bellamy, who became an actress. The diarist Sylas Neville mentions meeting a naval officer stationed at Great Yarmouth in 1771 "whose name is O'Hara, a natural son of Lord Tyrawley" but this is likely to have been naval Lieutenant William Henry King O'Hara (d. 1789).

== Sources ==
- Baron's Tyrawley accounts from Russia have been released in: Сборник Императорского русского исторического общества, том 102: Дипломатическая переписка английских послов и посланников при русском дворе: Сообщ. из англ. гос. архива М-ва иностр., часть 12-ая: 1744 - 1745 г., С -Петербург 1898.
- Heathcote, Tony (1999). The British Field Marshals 1736-1997. Pen & Sword Books Ltd. ISBN 0-85052-696-5.

Military offices
Preceded by The Lord Tyrawley	Colonel of The Royal Regiment of Fuzileers; 1713–1739	Succeeded by William Hargrave
Preceded by Thomas Pearce	Colonel of the 5th Regiment of Horse; 1739–1743	Succeeded by John Brown
Preceded by The Earl of Crawford	Captain and Colonel of the 2nd Troop Horse Grenadier Guards; 1743–1745	Succeeded by The Earl of Rothes
Preceded by The 2nd Earl of Albemarle	Captain and Colonel of the 3rd Troop of Horse Guards; 1745–1746	Regiment disbanded
Preceded by Francis Columbine	Colonel of The Lord Tyrawley's Regiment; 1746–1749	Succeeded by Edward Pole
Preceded by Archibald Hamilton	Colonel of the 14th Regiment of Dragoons; 1749–1752	Succeeded by Louis Dejean
Preceded by Humphrey Bland	Colonel of the 3rd (King's Own) Regiment of Dragoons; 1752–1755	Succeeded by The 3rd Earl of Albemarle
Preceded by The 2nd Earl of Albemarle	Colonel of the Coldstream Regiment of Foot Guards; 1755–1773	Succeeded by The Earl Waldegrave
Preceded by Earl of Stair	Governor of Minorca; 1747–1756	Succeeded by Hyacinthe Gaëtan de Lannion
Preceded by Thomas Fowke	Governor of Gibraltar; 1756–1757	Succeeded by The Earl of Home
Preceded by Henry Hawley	Governor of Portsmouth; 1759–1773	Succeeded by Edward Harvey
Peerage of Ireland
Preceded by Charles O'Hara	Baron Tyrawley; 1724–1774	Extinct
New creation	Baron Kilmaine; 1722–1774	Extinct
