= Governor of Gibraltar =

Representative of the British monarch in the British overseas territory of Gibraltar

- Coat of arms of Gibraltar

- Flag

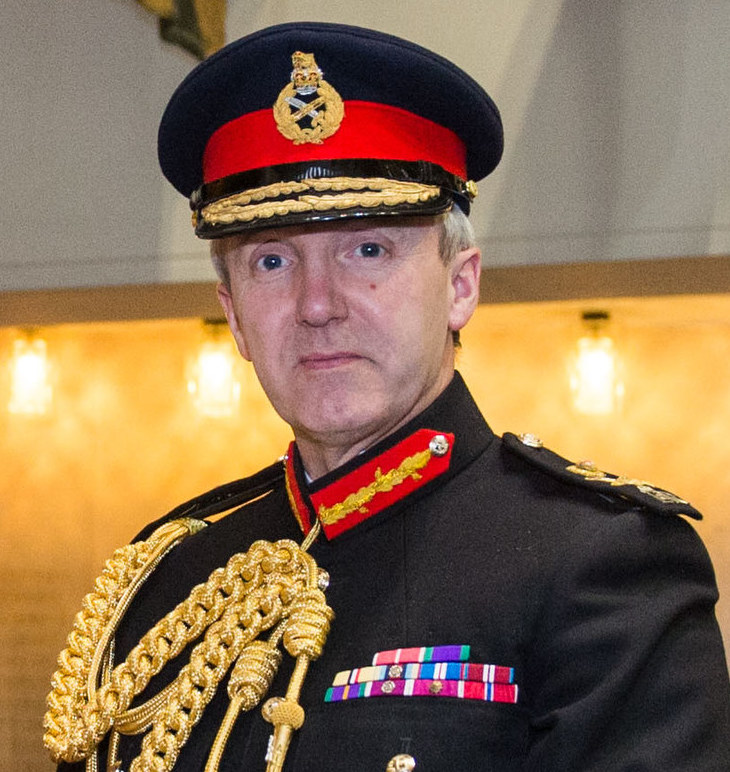
- Incumbent; Sir Ben Bathurst since 4 June 2024
- Style: His Excellency
- Residence: The Convent, Main Street, Gibraltar
- Appointer: Monarch
- Term length: At His Majesty's pleasure (usually for at least 4 years)
- Formation: 24 July 1704; 322 years ago
- First holder: Sir George Rooke
- Salary: £95,000 annually
- Website: Office of the Governor

The governor of Gibraltar is the representative of the British monarch in the British overseas territory of Gibraltar. The governor is appointed by the monarch on the advice of the British government. The role of the governor is to act as the de facto head of state. They are responsible for formally appointing the chief minister of Gibraltar, along with other members of the government of Gibraltar after a general election. The governor serves as commander-in-chief of Gibraltar's military forces and has sole responsibility for defence and security. Although recent appointments have all been former military personnel, most being former Royal Navy or Royal Marines flag officers, Sir James Dutton resigned from the role in 2015, complaining that it was "more representational and ceremonial than I had expected".

The governor has his own flag in Gibraltar, the Union Flag defaced with the territory's coat of arms. However, at the governor's official residence (The Convent), the Union Flag and the flag of Gibraltar are also flown.

== List of governors of Gibraltar ==
(Dates in italics indicate de facto continuation of office)

Picture	Term	Incumbent	Notes
	4 August 1704	Habsburg occupation	
	4 August 1704 to 6 August 1704	Prince George of Hesse-Darmstadt	Appointed by Archduke Charles
	6 August 1704 to November 1704	Henry Nugent	Appointed by Archduke Charles
	24 December 1704 to 24 December 1707	John Shrimpton, Governor	Appointed by Archduke Charles
	24 December 1707 to 24 January 1711	Roger Elliott, Governor	
	24 January 1711 to 13 July 1713	Thomas Stanwix, Governor	
	13 July 1713	Spain cedes Gibraltar to Great Britain in the Treaty of Utrecht	
	13 July 1713 to 7 August 1713	Brigadier-General Thomas Stanwix, Governor	
	7 August 1713 to 2 January 1730	General David Colyear, 1st Earl of Portmore, Governor	
Richard Kane	20 October 1725 to 2 February 1727	Richard Kane, acting Governor	
	2 February 1727 to 13 May 1730	Jasper Clayton, Lieutenant Governor	
	15 May 1730 to 24 October 1739	General Joseph Sabine, Governor	
	24 October 1739 to 22 April 1740	Francis Columbine, Governor	
	22 April 1740 to 14 March 1748/9	William Hargrave, Governor	
	14 March 1748/9 to 31 May 1754	Humphrey Bland, Governor	
	31 May 1754 to 12 July 1756	Thomas Fowke, Governor	
	12 July 1756 to 16 April 1757	Lieutenant-General James O'Hara, 2nd Baron Tyrawley, Governor	Later promoted to field marshal.
William Home	16 April 1757 to 28 April 1761	William Home, 8th Earl of Home, Governor	
	28 April 1761 to 23 June 1761	John Toovey, acting Governor	
	13 June 1761 to 14 June 1761	Major-General John Parslow, acting Governor	
	14 June 1761 to January 1776	Edward Cornwallis, Governor	
	1765 to 1767	John Irwin, acting Governor	
	January 1776 to 25 May 1777	Robert Boyd, acting Governor	1st Term
	25 May 1777 to 14 June 1787	George Augustus Eliott, Governor	Great Siege of Gibraltar; (24 June 1779 – 7 February 1783)
	14 June 1787 to July 1790	Lord Heathfield, Governor	
	July 1790 to October 1790	Sir Robert Boyd, acting Governor	
	October 1790 to 13 May 1794	Sir Robert Boyd, Governor	2nd Term
	1794–1795	Sir Henry Clinton, Governor	Died in London before taking up the post
	13 May 1794 to 30 December 1795	Charles Rainsford, Governor	Robert Boyd's second-in-command and assumed position on his death
	30 December 1795 to 25 February 1802	Charles O'Hara, Governor	
	25 February 1802 to 10 May 1802	Charles Barnett Governor	
	24 May 1802 to 23 January 1820	Prince Edward, Duke of Kent and Strathearn	
	2 May 1803 to 17 December 1804	Sir Thomas Trigge, acting Governor	For the Duke of Kent
	17 December 1804 to June 1806	Henry Edward Fox, acting Governor	For the Duke of Kent
	June 1806 to November 1806	James Drummond, acting Governor	1st Term; for the Duke of Kent
	November 1806 to August 1808	Sir Hew Dalrymple, acting Governor	For the Duke of Kent
	August 1808 to May 1809	James Drummond, acting Governor	2nd Term; for the Duke of Kent
	May 1809 to August 1809	Sir John Cradock, acting Governor	For the Duke of Kent
	August 1809 to October 1809	Brigadier-General John Smith, acting Governor	For the Duke of Kent; Sir John Smith from 1831, later promoted to full general
	October 1809 to November 1809	Alex McKenzie Fraser, acting Governor	For the Duke of Kent
	November 1809 to 2 April 1814	Colin Campbell, acting Governor	For the Duke of Kent
	3 April 1814 to 15 November 1821	Sir George Don, acting Governor	1st Term; for the Duke of Kent
	29 January 1820 to 1835	John Pitt, 2nd Earl of Chatham, Governor	
	7 June 1825 to 20 June 1830	Sir George Don, acting Governor	2nd Term; for the Earl of Chatham
	20 June 1830	Gibraltar becomes a British Crown colony	
	20 June 1830 to 10 May 1831	Sir George Don, acting Governor	2nd Term; for the Earl of Chatham
	10 May 1831 to 29 May 1835	Sir William Houston, acting Governor	For the Earl of Chatham
	28 February 1835 to 11 October 1842	Sir Alexander Woodford, Governor	
	11 October 1842 to 12 December 1848	Sir Robert Wilson, Governor	
	12 December 1848 to 26 July 1855	Sir Robert Gardiner, Governor	
	26 July 1855 to 5 May 1859	Sir James Fergusson, Governor	
	5 May 1859 to 21 September 1865	Sir William Codrington, Governor	
	21 September 1865 to 25 July 1870	Sir Richard Airey, Governor	
	25 July 1870 to 23 June 1876	Sir Fenwick Williams, Governor	
	23 June 1876 to 3 January 1883	Robert Napier, 1st Baron Napier of Magdala, Governor	
	3 January 1883 to 2 November 1886	Sir John Miller Adye, Governor	
	2 November 1886 to 23 August 1890	Sir Arthur Hardinge, Governor	
	23 August 1890 to 27 January 1891	Sir Leicester Smyth, Governor	
	27 January 1891 to 31 March 1891	Sir Henry Richard Legge Newdigate, acting Governor	
	31 March 1891 to 27 June 1893	Sir Lothian Nicholson, Governor	
	27 June 1893 to 7 August 1893	G.J. Smart, acting Governor	
	7 August 1893 to 22 May 1900	Sir Robert Biddulph, Governor	
	22 May 1900 to 1 August 1905	Sir George Stuart White, Governor	
	1 August 1905 to 30 July 1910	Sir Frederick Forestier-Walker, Governor	
	30 July 1910 to 11 July 1913	Sir Archibald Hunter, Governor	
	11 July 1913 to 9 July 1918	Sir Herbert Miles, Governor	
	9 July 1918 to 26 May 1923	Sir Horace Smith-Dorrien, Governor	
	26 May 1923 to 13 August 1928	Sir Charles Monro, Governor	
	13 August 1928 to 13 May 1933	Sir Alexander Godley, Governor	
	13 May 1933 to 12 August 1938	Sir Charles Harington, Governor	
	12 August 1938 to 11 July 1939	Sir Edmund Ironside, Governor	
	11 July 1939 to 14 May 1941	Sir Clive Gerard Liddell, Governor	
	14 May 1941 to 31 May 1942	John Vereker, 6th Viscount Gort, Governor	
	31 May 1942 to 14 February 1944	Sir Noel Mason-Macfarlane, Governor	
	14 February 1944 to 8 February 1947	Sir Ralph Eastwood, Governor	
	8 February 1947 to 23 April 1952	Sir Kenneth Anderson, Governor	
	23 April 1952 to 6 May 1955	Sir Gordon MacMillan, Governor	
	6 May 1955 to 16 April 1958	Sir Harold Redman, Governor	
	16 April 1958 to 8 June 1962	Sir Charles Keightley, Governor	
	8 June 1962 to 5 August 1965	Sir Alfred Ward, Governor	
	5 August 1965 to March 1969	Sir Gerald Lathbury, Governor	
	March 1969 to 3 October 1973	Admiral of the Fleet Sir Varyl Begg, Governor	
	3 October 1973 to 30 May 1978	Marshal of the RAF Sir John Grandy, Governor	
	30 May 1978 to 1981	General Sir William Jackson, Governor	
	1981	Gibraltar becomes a British dependent territory	Under the British Nationality Act 1981
	1981 to 26 October 1982	General Sir William Jackson, Governor	
	26 October 1982 to 19 November 1985	Admiral Sir David Williams, Governor	
	19 November 1985 to December 1989	Air Chief Marshal Sir Peter Terry, Governor	
	December 1989 to April 1993	Sir Derek Reffell, Governor	
	April 1993 to 5 December 1995	Sir John Chapple, Governor	
	5 December 1995 to 19 February 1997	Admiral Sir Hugo White, Governor	
	24 February 1997 to 21 March 2000	Sir Richard Luce, Governor	
	21 March 2000 to 5 April 2000	Paul Speller, acting Governor	
	5 April 2000 to 2002	David Durie, Governor	
	2002	Gibraltar becomes a British overseas territory	Under the British Overseas Territories Act 2002
	2002 to 16 May 2003	David Durie, Governor	Sir David Durie from 1 January 2003
	16 May 2003 to 27 May 2003	David Blunt, acting Governor	
	27 May 2003 to 17 July 2006	Sir Francis Richards, Governor	
	17 July 2006 to 27 September 2006	Philip Barton, acting Governor	
	27 September 2006 to 21 October 2009	Lieutenant-General Sir Robert Fulton, Governor	
	21 October 2009 to 26 October 2009	Lesley Pallett, acting Governor	
	26 October 2009 to 13 November 2013	Vice Admiral Sir Adrian Johns, Governor	
	13 November 2013 to 6 December 2013	Alison MacMillan, Interim Governor	
	6 December 2013 to 28 September 2015	Lieutenant General Sir James Dutton, Governor	
	28 September 2015 to 19 January 2016	Alison MacMillan, Interim Governor	
	19 January 2016 to 18 February 2020	Lieutenant General Ed Davis, Governor	
	18 February 2020 to 11 June 2020	Nick Pyle, acting Governor	
	11 June 2020 to 23 May 2024	Vice Admiral Sir David Steel, Governor	
	23 May 2024 to 4 June 2024	Marc Holland, acting Governor	
	4 June 2024 to present	Lieutenant General Sir Ben Bathurst, Governor	

== See also ==
- The Convent
- Flag of the governor of Gibraltar
- Chief Minister of Gibraltar
