= William Hargrave (governor) =

British army officer

Lieutenant-General William Hargrave
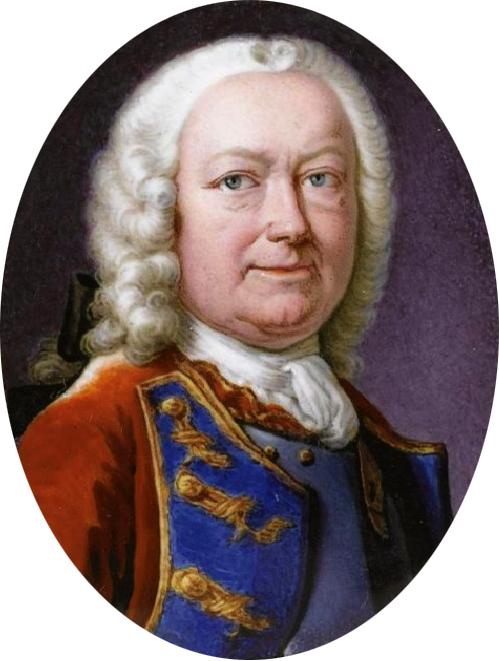
- Portrait by Abraham Seaman
- Died: 21 January 1751
- Military career
- Allegiance: England; Great Britain
- Branch: English Army; British Army
- Service years: 1694–1751
- Rank: Lieutenant-general
- Conflicts: Nine Years' War; War of the Spanish Succession; Jacobite rising of 1715

Lieutenant-General William Hargrave (died 21 January 1751) was a British army officer who served as the governor of Gibraltar from 1740 to 1749.

== Military career ==
Hargrave was commissioned into Viscount Charlemonte's Regiment of Foot in 1694. He fought with his regiment in the Low Countries from 1694 to 1696. In 1702, during the War of the Spanish Succession, he fought at the Battle of Cádiz and the Battle of Vigo Bay; he was also present at the Siege of Barcelona in 1705 and at the Battle of Almansa in 1707.

He was also active at the Battle of Sheriffmuir in 1715 during the Jacobite rising. He was made colonel of the 31st Regiment of Foot in 1730. That same year he was instructed to proceed to Portsmouth and embark with reinforcements for Jersey where the Lieutenant Governor had failed to contain a riot. In 1739 he became Colonel of The Royal Fusiliers just before he became Governor of Gibraltar in 1740. He died in 1751 and is buried in Westminster Abbey. His monument is by Roubiliac.

Military offices
Preceded by Hon. Charles Cathcart	Colonel of Hargrave's Regiment of Foot; 1731–1737	Succeeded by William Handasyde
Preceded by Richard Kane	Colonel of Hargrave's Regiment of Foot; 1737–1739	Succeeded by George Read
Preceded by James O'Hara	Colonel of The Royal Regiment of Fuzileers; 1739–1751	Succeeded by John Mostyn
Government offices
Preceded by Joseph Sabine	Governor of Gibraltar; 1740–1749	Succeeded by Humphrey Bland
