= List of governors of Menorca =

Below is a list of (known) governors of British Minorca from the time of the British occupation in 1708 until the British relinquished control of the island for the last time in 1802.

== Background ==
It was commonplace for governors to be absent from the island, and several never set foot there. Menorca changed hands several times in the 18th century. It was ruled by Britain from its initial capture in 1708 until 1756, then occupied by France for seven years until the Peace of Paris (1763) when it was returned to Britain. In 1781, the island fell to a Spanish invasion, and in 1783, Britain ceded the island to Spain. It was captured by the British for a final time in 1798 and occupied until it was returned in 1802 to Spain.

=== Spanish rule (15th century – 1707) ===
- ?
- 1451: Pere de Bell-lloc i de Sentmenat
- 1467–1505: Guillem de Santcliment
  - 1485: Guillem Ramón Dez Vall, Lieutenant of the Governor Guillem de Santcliment
  - 1497: Francesc de Armedans, Regent
- 1506–1532: Frederic de Santcliment
- 1535–1536: Pere de Figarola
- 1536–1555: Francesc Girón de Rebolledo
- 1555–1558: Guillem de Rocafull
- 1558–1575: Joan de Cardona i Rocabertí
  - 1558 (June–July): Bartolomé Arguimbau, Regent
  - 1558 (July): Francesc des Cors, Horaci de Villalonga, Regents
- 1575–1583: Francesc Guimerà
- 1583–1587: Miquel de Pacs
  - 1584: Francesc de Vives, Lieutenant of the Governor Miquel de Pacs
  - 1586: Pere de Lozano, Lieutenant of the Governor Miquel de Pacs
  - 1586 (October): Rafael Squella, Lieutenant of the Governor Miquel de Pacs
  - 1587: Antoni Fortuny, Regent
- 1587–1593: Jeroni de Josa
- 1593–1594: Pedro de Heredia (first time)
  - 1594: Antoni Fortuny, Regent
- 1596–1597: Cosme Climent
- 1597–1598: Pedro de Heredia (second time)
- 1598–1600: Pablo de Blas
- 1600–1612: Cristóbal de Prado
  - 1604–1611: Pablo de Blas, Lieutenant of the Governor Cristóbal de Prado and Captain general
- 1612–1619: Gaspar de Castelvì
- 1619–1621: Vicent Sanchez
- 1621–1624: Juan de Castelvì
- 1624–1628: Baltasar de Borja (first time)
- 1628–1631: Pedro Ferrer
- 1631–1633: Francisco Sureda
- 1633–1636: Jayme Valenciano
- 1636 (August–October): Gregorio de Villalonga (first time)
- 1636–1637: Antonio de Oquendo
- 1637 (May–June): Francisco Diaz
- 1637 (June–October): Gregorio de Villalonga (second time)
  - 1637(July): Pedro de Gavara, Lieutenant of the Governon Gregorio de Villalonga
- 1637–1638: Baltazar de Borja (second time)
  - 1637(October): Domingo de Herrera, Regent
- 1638 (July–October): Martin Carlos de Mencos
- 1638–1639: Domingo de Herrera
- 1639 (June–July): Gregorio de Villalonga (third time)
- 1639–1642: Fernando Fernandez Mazuelo
- 1642–1645: Pedro Santacilia
- 1645–1650: Josep de Rocabertí
- 1650 (October): Jayme de Oleza
- 1650–1653: Josef Esporrín
- 1653 (April–August): Bernardino Andreu
- 1653–1658: Antonio Imperial
- 1658 (February–October): Felipe de la Nuza
- 1658–1659: Bernardino Andreu
- 1659 (March–August): Raymundo Torrella
- 1659–1663: Isidoro Sanz
- 1663 (August–October): Sebastian Duran
- 1663–1664: Pedro Berga
- 1664 (January–May): Josef de Borja
- 1664 (May–August): Antonio de Verì
- 1664–1671: Juan de Bayarte (first time)
- 1671–1678: Josef Pardo (first time)
- 1678–1680: Juan Domenéch
- 1680–1681: Francisco Net (first time)
- 1681–1684: Juan de Bayarte (second time)
- 1684 (July–October): Josef Pardo (second time)
- 1684–1687: Francisco Net (second time)
- 1687 (March–April): Francisco Martorell
- 1687 (April–October): Josef Sisternes
- 1687–1691: Valentin Sanchez
- 1691–1694: Francisco Net (third time)
- 1694–1701: Sebastian Suau de Ventimilla
- 1701–1703: Geronimo Torrijos
- 1703–1706: Francisco Falcò
- 1706: Geronimo Perez de Nueros
- 1706 (October): Diego Leonardo Davila
- 1706 (October): Francisco Net (fourth time)
- 1706–1708 Joan Miquel Saura Morell

=== British rule (1708–1756) ===
==== Governors ====
- 1708–1711: James Stanhope, who captured Menorca from Spain
- 1712–1713: John Campbell, 2nd Duke of Argyll
- 1714–1714: Charles Mordaunt, 3rd Earl of Peterborough. His appointment was cancelled before he could go.
- 1714–1716: John Campbell, 2nd Duke of Argyll
- 1716–1731: George Carpenter
- 1733–1736: Richard Kane
- 1737–1742: Algernon Seymour, Earl of Hertford
- 1742–1747: John Dalrymple, 2nd Earl of Stair
- 1747–1756: James O'Hara, 2nd Baron Tyrawley; he never visited Menorca and from 1747 to June 1756, control was exercised by the Lieutenant-Governor, William Blakeney.

==== Lieutenant-governors ====
- 1712-1733 Richard Kane
- 1733-1747 Philip Anstruther

=== French occupation (1756–1763) ===
- 1756–1758: Hyacinthe Gaëtan de Lannion (first time)
- 1758–1759: Jean Toussaint de la Pierre, marquis de Frémeur
- 1759–1760: Louis-Félicien de Boffin d'Argenson et Pusignieu (first time)
- 1760–1762: Hyacinthe Gaëtan de Lannion (second time)
- 1762–1763: Louis-Félicien de Boffin d'Argenson et Pusignieu (second time)

=== British rule (1763–1782) ===
==== Governors ====
- 1763: Sir Richard Lyttelton
- 1766: George Howard
- 1768: John Mostyn
- 1778: James Murray

==== Lieutenant-governors ====
- 1763: James Johnston
- 1774: James Murray
- 1779: Sir William Draper

During the absence of the Governor or Lieutenant-Governor, the island was governed by the military commandant: Colonel John Crawford until his death in 1765, and Major-General John Barlow from 1770.

=== British occupation (1798–1802) ===
- 1798–1800: Charles Stuart
- 1800–1802: Henry Edward Fox

=== Restored to Spain (1802–present) ===
As part of the Balearic Islands, Menorca was later governed by insular councils before devolved government came into effect in 1977.

== See also ==
- Great Britain in the Seven Years War
- Menorca – History section
- Mordaunt Cracherode

== Sources ==
- Simpson, JM; Lea, RS (1970). ANSTRUTHER, Philip (c.1680-1760), of Airdrie, Fife in The History of Parliament: the House of Commons 1715-1754. Boydell & Brewer.
- Stephens, HM; Harding, Richard (2008). "Blakeney, William, Baron Blakeney". Oxford Dictionary of National Biography (online ed.). Oxford University Press. doi:10.1093/ref:odnb/2591. (Subscription or UK public library membership required.)
- Rulers.org, B. Schemmel
- Serie cronologica de los gobernadores de Menorca desde 1287 hasta 1815 inclusive
- (in Catalan)La projecció política catalana a Mallorca a l'època dels Àustries, els governadors de les illes de Menorca i Eivissa
