= Obrecheuil =

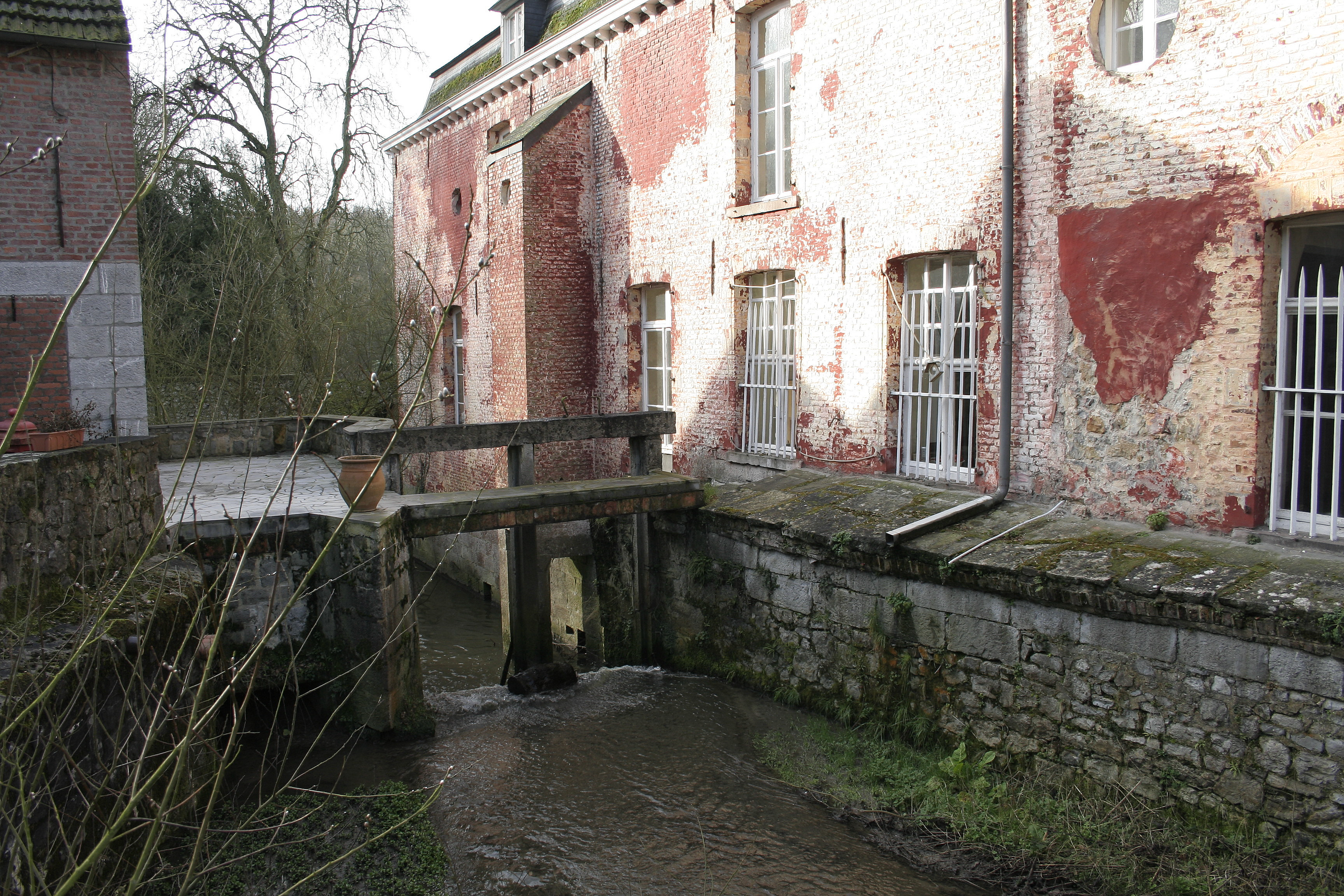
- Old water mill (Moulin de la Roquette) in Casteau

Location
- Country: Belgium

Physical characteristics
- Mouth: Haine
  - coordinates: 50°28′11″N 4°00′10″E

Basin features
- Progression: Haine→ Scheldt→ North Sea

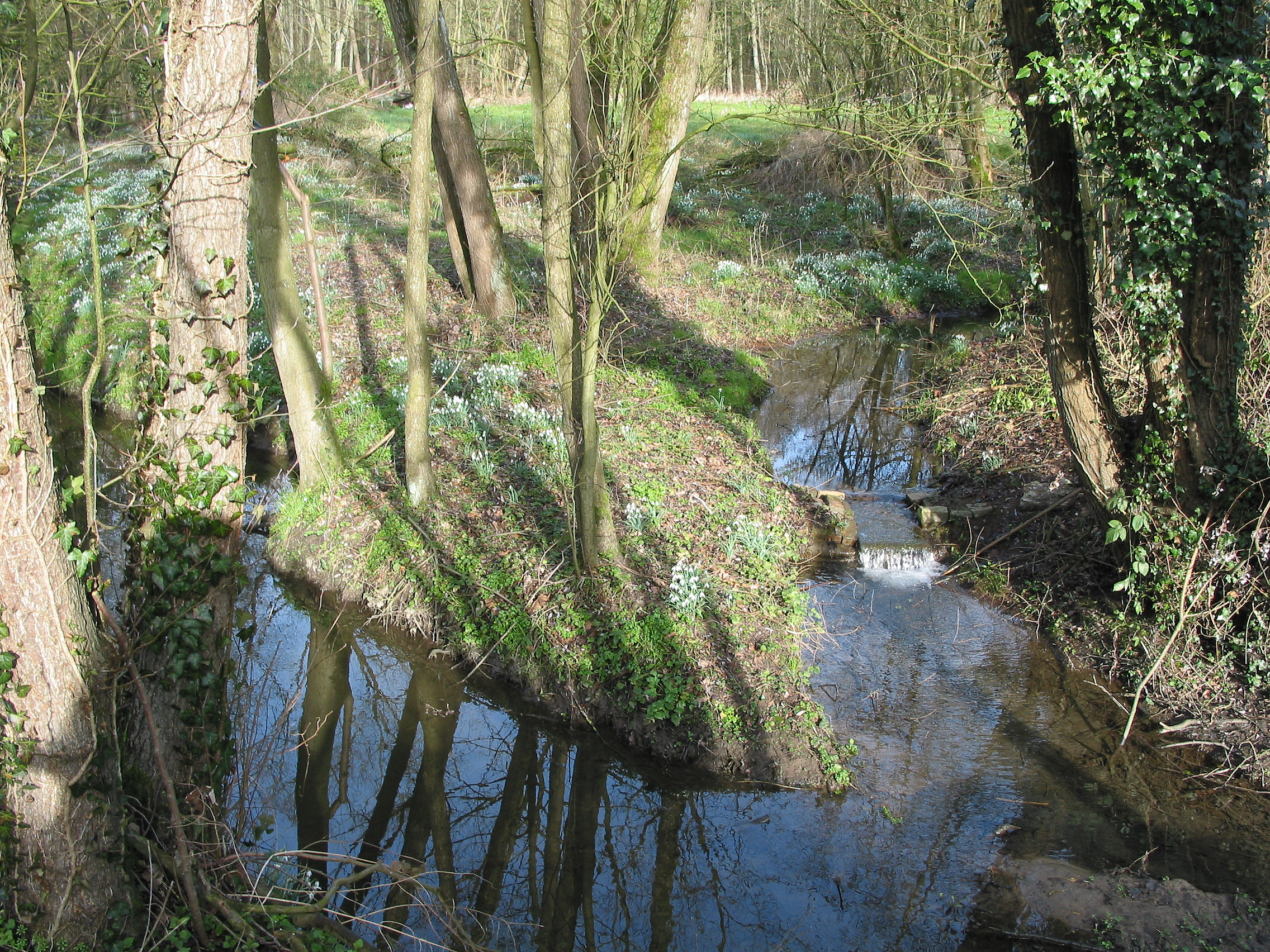
Near cultivation of watercress in Casteau

The Obrecheuil is a small river of Belgium, right tributary of the Haine. The spring is in the municipality of Le Rœulx. The river flows through the village of Thieusies, Casteau and St-Denis, to end her trip in the village of Obourg where the river meets the river Haine. The length of the river between the spring and the river Haine is about 20 kilometres (12 mi). Sometimes the river is named Aubrecheuil.

Around the river is a fertile valley known as a centre for growing chicory, hops, and earlier in the 20th century tobacco.
