= Casteau =

District in Soignies, Belgium

- Village
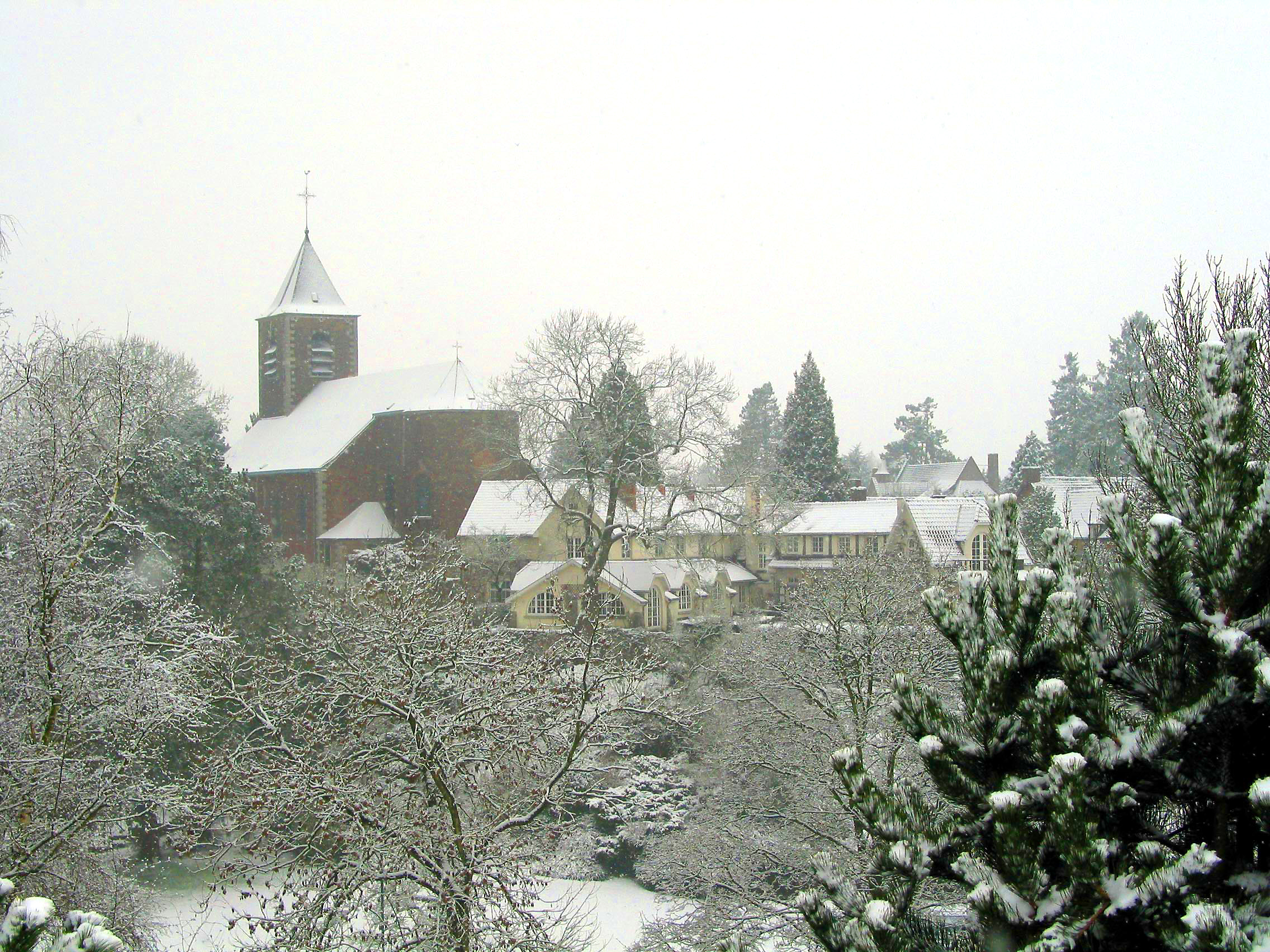
- Casteau, old village under the snow. Photo by Jean-Pol Grandmont

- Seal

- Location in Belgium
- Coordinates: 50°31′00″N 4°00′09″E
- Country: Belgium
- Region: Wallonia
- Province: Hainaut
- Municipality: Soignies

Area
  - Total: 10.52 km^{2} (4.06 sq mi)
- Highest elevation: 115 m (377 ft)
- Lowest elevation: 63 m (207 ft)

Population (2021)
  - Total: 3,018
  - Density: 288/km^{2} (750/sq mi)
- Demonym: Castellois(e)
- Time zone: UTC+01 (CET)
- Postal code: 7061

Casteau (Walloon: Castea) originated as a village in the Hainaut province of Wallonia, in the French speaking south of Belgium. Casteau has become a district of the municipality of Soignies, centred around Soignies (town), and together with the former villages, now districts: Chaussée-Notre-Dame-Louvignies, Horrues, Naast, Neufvilles, and Thieusies.

The village is located between the towns of Mons and Soignies on the Mons-Brussels road. The river Obrecheuil flows through the village. In the past, there were some watermills along the river.

== Etymology ==
The name Casteau is derived from the French word for castle, château, and stems from the Latin castellum.

== History ==
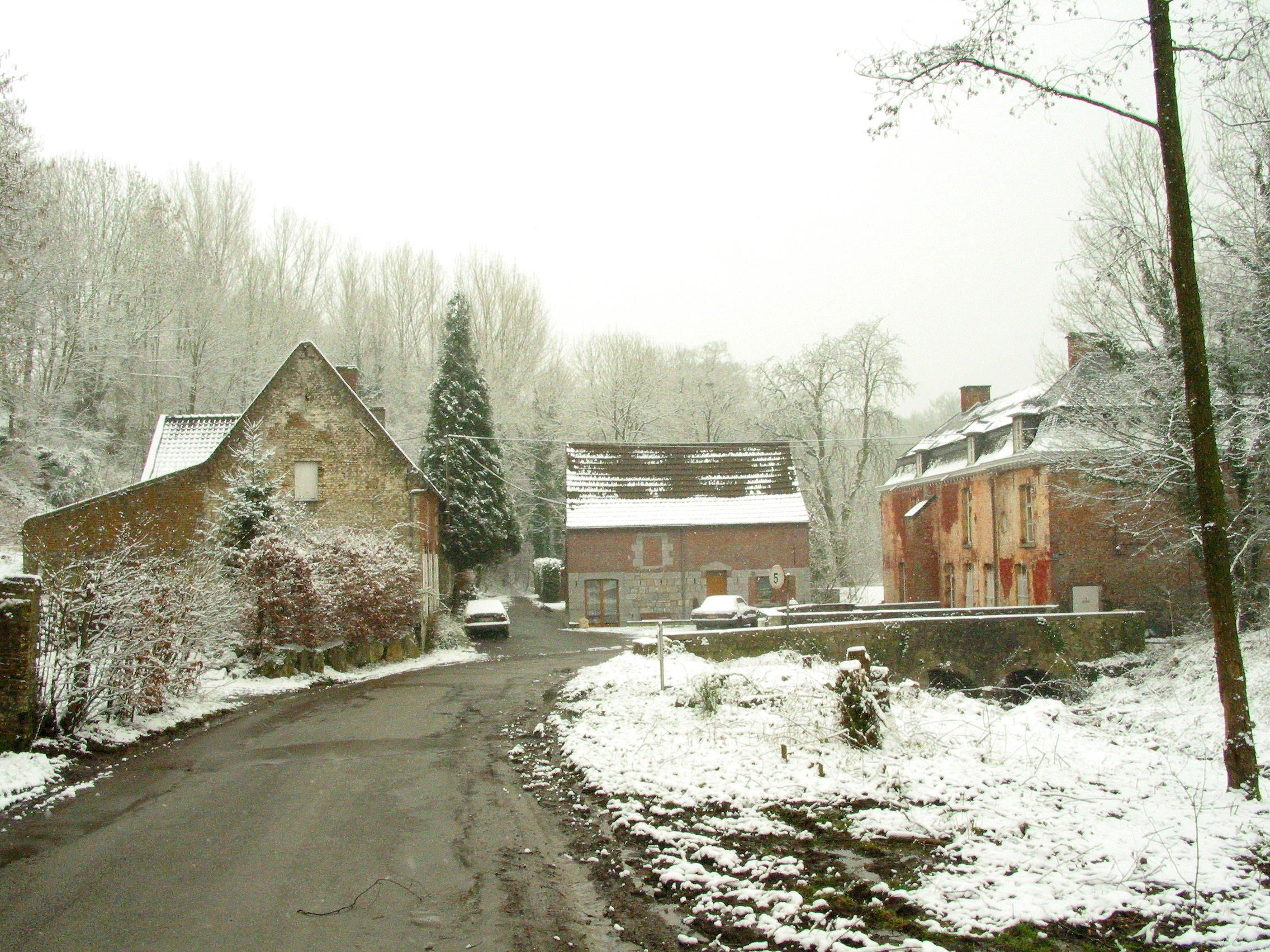
Casteau, the old watermill. Photo by Jean-Pol Grandmont

Casteau was already known in Neolithic times. A Roman cemetery from the times of Marcus Aurelius has been discovered.

- 1678: French soldiers destroyed the village during the Battle of Saint-Denis against the Dutch army of William III of Orange.
- 1825: A part of the western plain became a military camp for the Dutch army until the Belgian Revolution in 1830.
- 1914: August 22, Captain Charles Hornby was reputed to have become the first British soldier to kill a German soldier using his sword and Drummer Edward Thomas of C squadron, Royal Dragoon Guards was the first British soldier to fire a shot in the first skirmish between British and German troops in the First World War. This is commemorated by the first shot memorial in the village.
- 1940: German troops occupied the barracks until 1944.
- 1967: The SHAPE (Supreme Headquarters Allied Powers in Europe) moved into the base.
- 1977: Casteau was merged with other villages to make the municipality of Soignies.

== Landscape ==
The valley of the Obrecheuil is in the east of the village. This part of the valley is part of Natura 2000 protected areas. The heart of the village is in the northwest higher part of the valley. The northwestern part of the village is a plain with dispersed houses and farms with typical hedges. The village is the border between the valley of The Haine (Elevation from 20 to 30m) and the plateau of Hainaut (elevation from 80 to 150 m).

Around the village, there are several woods (comprising oaks, beeches, chestnuts, and poplars), fields (growing potatoes, sugar beets, corn, and wheat), and prairies (for cows and horses). The ground is made of sands and silts.

== Local specialty and collection ==
- Brewery and artisanal cheese called l'Augrenoise.
- Bus collection
