= Neufville =

Neufville is a surname. Notable people with this surname include:

- Eddie Neufville (born 1976), Liberian sprinter
- Edward Neufville Tailer (1830–1917), American merchant
- Georg von Neufville (1883–1941), German Wehrmacht officer
- Jean de Neufville (1729–1796), Dutch banker
- Josh Neufville (born 2001), English football player
- Leendert Pieter de Neufville (1729–1811), Dutch merchant
- Marilyn Neufville (born 1952), Jamaican sprinter
- Neufville de Villeroy family
  - Camille (1606–1693), French archbishop
  - François (1644–1730), French military leader and nobleman
  - François Paul (1677–1731), French archbishop
  - Nicolas IV (1543–1617), French politician and nobleman
  - Nicolas V (1598–1685), French military leader and nobleman
- Renee Neufville, American singer, member of Zhané
- Vashon Neufville (born 1999), English football player

== See also ==
- Neufville Typefoundry, in Barcelona, Spain
- Neufvilles
