= List of protected heritage sites in Soignies =

This table shows an overview of the protected heritage sites in the Walloon town Zinnik, or Soignies. This list is part of Belgium's national heritage.

Object	Year/architect	Town/section	Address	Coordinates	Number^{?}	Image
Chapel Marais Tilleriaux ^{(nl)} ^{(fr)}		Zinnik		50.581601°N 4.079177°E	55040-CLT-0001-01 Info	Kapel Marais Tilleriaux
The façade of the building on the Grand Place No. 9 in Soignies ^{(nl)} ^{(fr)}		Zinnik		50.579866°N 4.070022°E	55040-CLT-0002-01 Info	
Church of Saint-Vincent ^{(nl)} ^{(fr)}		Zinnik		50.579365°N 4.070450°E	55040-CLT-0003-01 Info	Kerk van Saint-Vincent
Collegiate Church of Saint-Vincent ^{(nl)} ^{(fr)}		Zinnik		50.579256°N 4.069909°E	55040-CLT-0004-01 Info	Kapittelkerk van Saint-Vincent
Original chapel of the old cemetery of Soignies and the whole of the chapel and the cemetery, including the gateway, the mausoleums and small tombs, that stretch along the paths ^{(nl)} ^{(fr)}		Zinnik		50.580843°N 4.070983°E	55040-CLT-0005-01 Info	Oorspronkelijke kapel van het oude kerkhof van Soignies alsook het geheel van de kapel en het kerkhof, inclusief de toegangspoort, de grafmonumenten en de kleine grafkapellen, die zich uitstrekken langs de paden
The quadrangle formed by the ancient monastic buildings, the cloister and the convent chapel of the Franciscan Sisters, in Soignies ^{(nl)} ^{(fr)}		Zinnik		50.576364°N 4.071412°E	55040-CLT-0006-01 Info	
The facades and roofs of the building on the rue Scaffart No. 3, in Soignies ^{(nl)} ^{(fr)}		Zinnik		50.579512°N 4.068451°E	55040-CLT-0007-01 Info	
Church of Saint Martin in Horrues ^{(nl)} ^{(fr)}		Zinnik		50.608613°N 4.042683°E	55040-CLT-0008-01 Info	Kerk van Saint-Martin, in Horrues
The church of Our Lady, in Chaussée-Notre-Dame-Louvignies ^{(nl)} ^{(fr)}		Zinnik		50.592509°N 3.998540°E	55040-CLT-0009-01 Info	De Onze-Lieve-Vrouwekerk, in Chaussée-Notre-Dame-Louvignies
The Saint Roch chapel in the rue de l'Ecole Moderne, in Soignies ^{(nl)} ^{(fr)}		Zinnik		50.576793°N 4.075233°E	55040-CLT-0010-01 Info	
The modern hotel on the rue de la Station No. 73, Soignies ^{(nl)} ^{(fr)}		Zinnik		50.574806°N 4.068592°E	55040-CLT-0011-01 Info	
Parts of walls, located at the intersection of the rue Neuve, the Place du Jeu de Balle and at the intersection of the Rue Neuve and Felix Eloy, as well as sections along the Place du Jeu de Balle plot between 398 B and the edge of the rue Chanoine Scarmure ^{(nl)} ^{(fr)}		Zinnik		50.578956°N 4.073438°E	55040-CLT-0012-01 Info	
Old quarry at Saint-Vincent, in Soignies ^{(nl)} ^{(fr)}		Zinnik		50.569986°N 4.102598°E	55040-CLT-0013-01 Info	
The facades and roofs of the main building on the rue Haute No. 9 in Soignies ^{(nl)} ^{(fr)}		Zinnik		50.584868°N 3.984638°E	55040-CLT-0014-01 Info	De voorgevels en daken van het hoofdgebouw aan de rue Haute nr. 9 te Soignies
The ramparts of the old cemetery, including the garden pavilions in the land (with the exception of the retaining wall along the pedestrian walkway) and the whole formed by these walls, in Soignies ^{(nl)} ^{(fr)}		Zinnik		50.580862°N 4.072925°E	55040-CLT-0015-01 Info	
Grande Carrière or "'Carrière Gauthier-Wincqz": offices, workshops, sawmill and workshop ^{(nl)} ^{(fr)}		Zinnik	rue Mademoiselle Hanicq, nrs. 32 to 40	50.566998°N 4.077372°E	55040-CLT-0016-01 Info	"Grand Carrière" of "Carrière Gauthier-Wincqz": bureaus, ateliers, houtzagerij en werkplaats
The enclosure walls, facades, roofs and the vaults and arches of the abbey farm on the Chemin de la Chape Lette No. 35. Part of a protected zone. ^{(nl)} ^{(fr)}		Zinnik		50.553748°N 3.981137°E	55040-CLT-0017-01 Info	De sluitingsmuren, voorgevels, daken alsook de gewelven en bogen van de abdijhoeve op de Chemin de la Chapelette nr. 35. Deel van een beschermde zone.
The whole of the St Vincent Church, with the exception of the organ. ^{(nl)} ^{(fr)}		Zinnik		50.579365°N 4.070450°E	55040-PEX-0001-01 Info	Het geheel van de Saint-Vincentkerk met uitzondering van het orgel.

== See also ==
- List of protected heritage sites in Hainaut (province)
- Soignies
