= Obourg =

Sub-municipality of the city of Mons, Belgium

Obourg Obour (Walloon)
- Sub-municipality of Mons
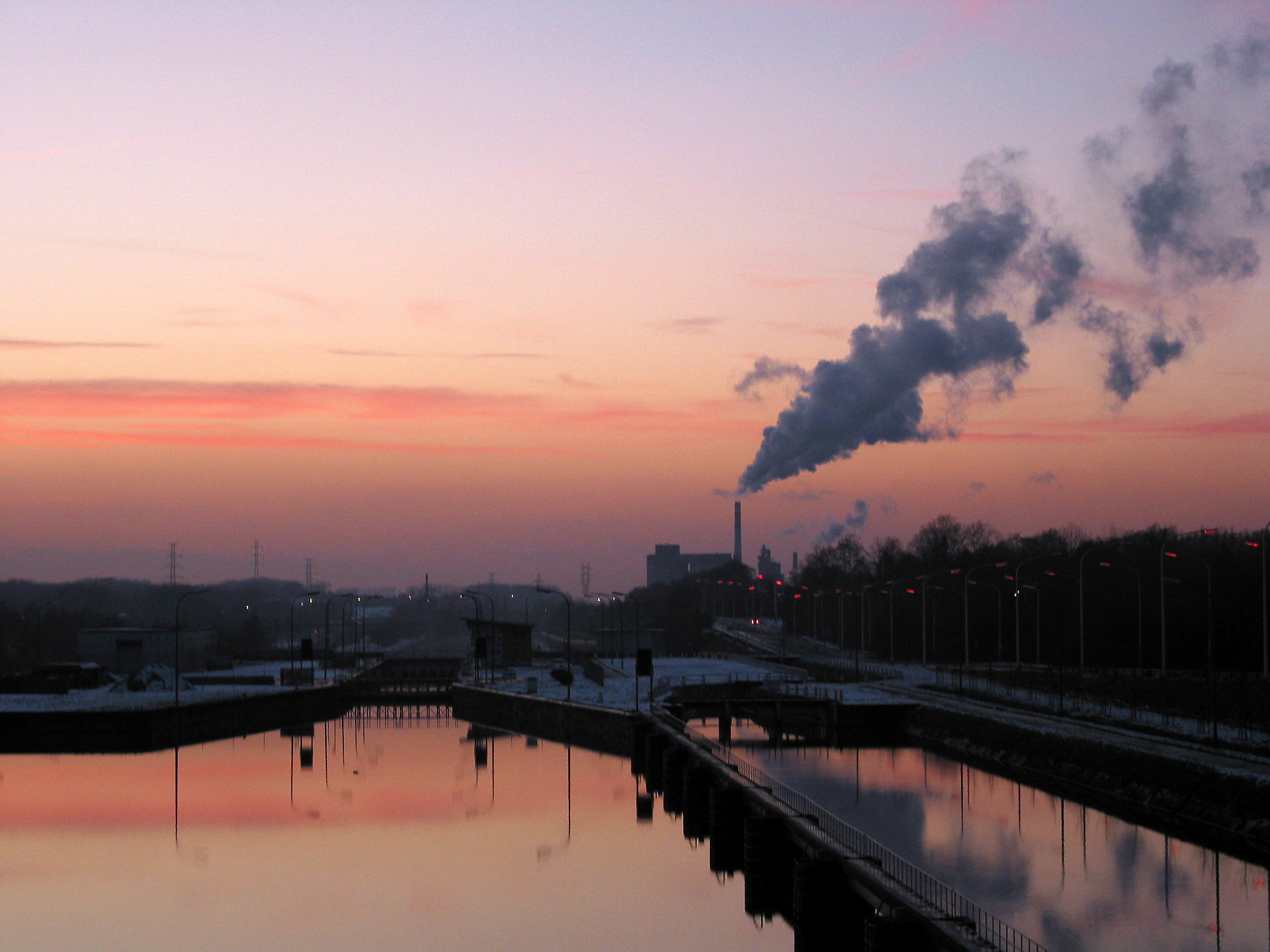
- Cement factories

- Coat of arms

- Location of Obourg in Mons
- Interactive map of Obourg
- Location within Belgium Location within Hainaut (Belgium)
- Coordinates: 50°28′34″N 4°00′22″E
- Country: Belgium
- Community: French Community
- Region: Wallonia
- Province: Hainaut
- Arrondissement: Mons
- Municipality: Mons

Area
  - Total: 14.13 km^{2} (5.46 sq mi)

Population (2020-01-01)
  - Total: 4,488 (incl. Saint-Denis)
- Postal codes: 7034
- Area codes: 065

Obourg (French pronunciation: [ɔbuʁ]; Walloon: Obour) is a sub-municipality of the city of Mons located in the province of Hainaut, Wallonia, Belgium. It was a separate municipality until 1972. In 1964, Saint-Denis was merged into Obourg. On 1 January 1972, Obourg was merged into Mons.

== History ==
It is the site of the first British soldier to be killed in the First World War, Private John Parr on 21 August 1914.

== Agriculture ==
Obourg was known for its tobacco in the past.

== See also ==
- Canal du Centre (Belgium)
- River Obrecheuil

== Gallery ==
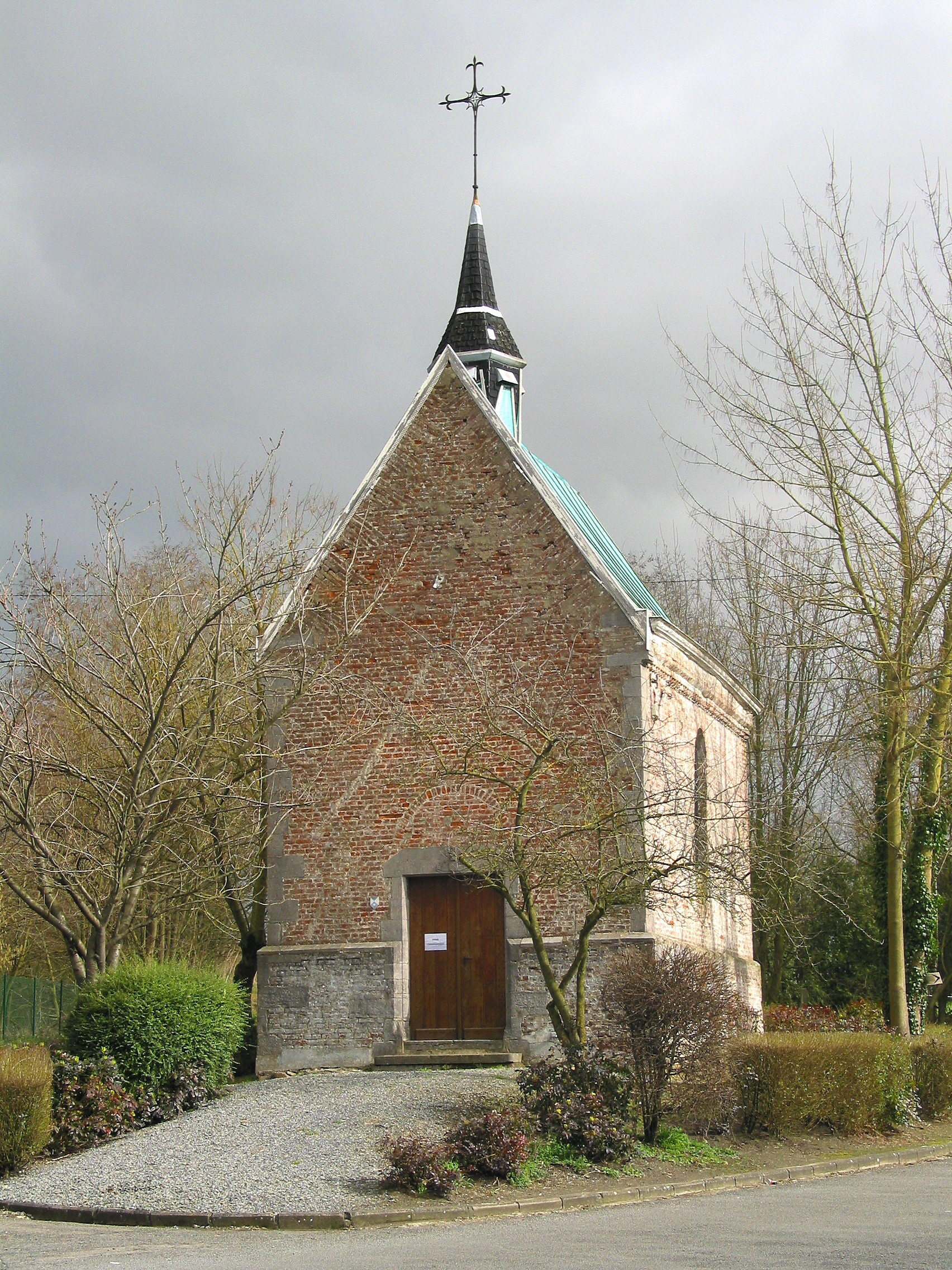
Chapel Saint-Macaire (1616).

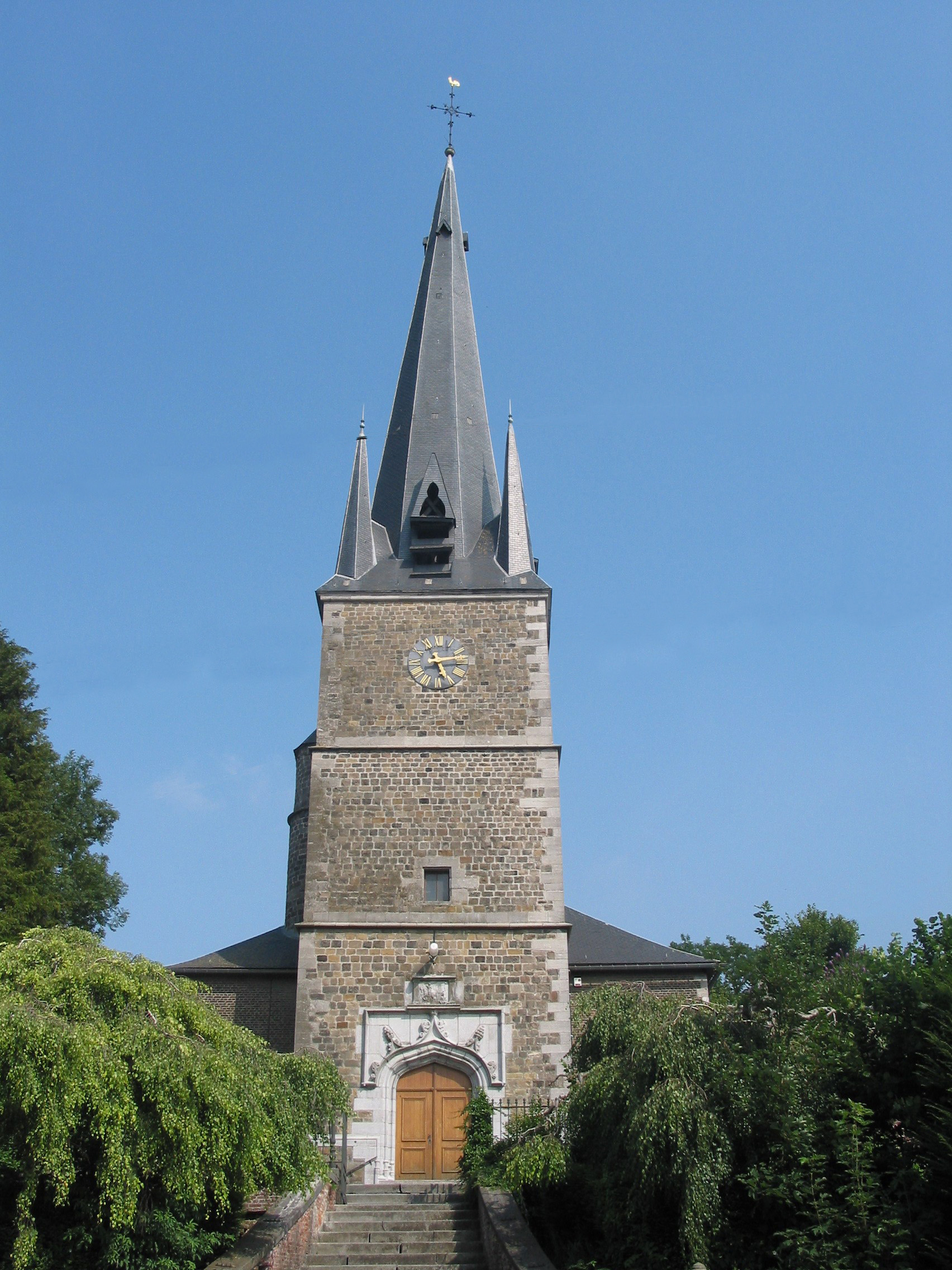
Church Saint-Martin.

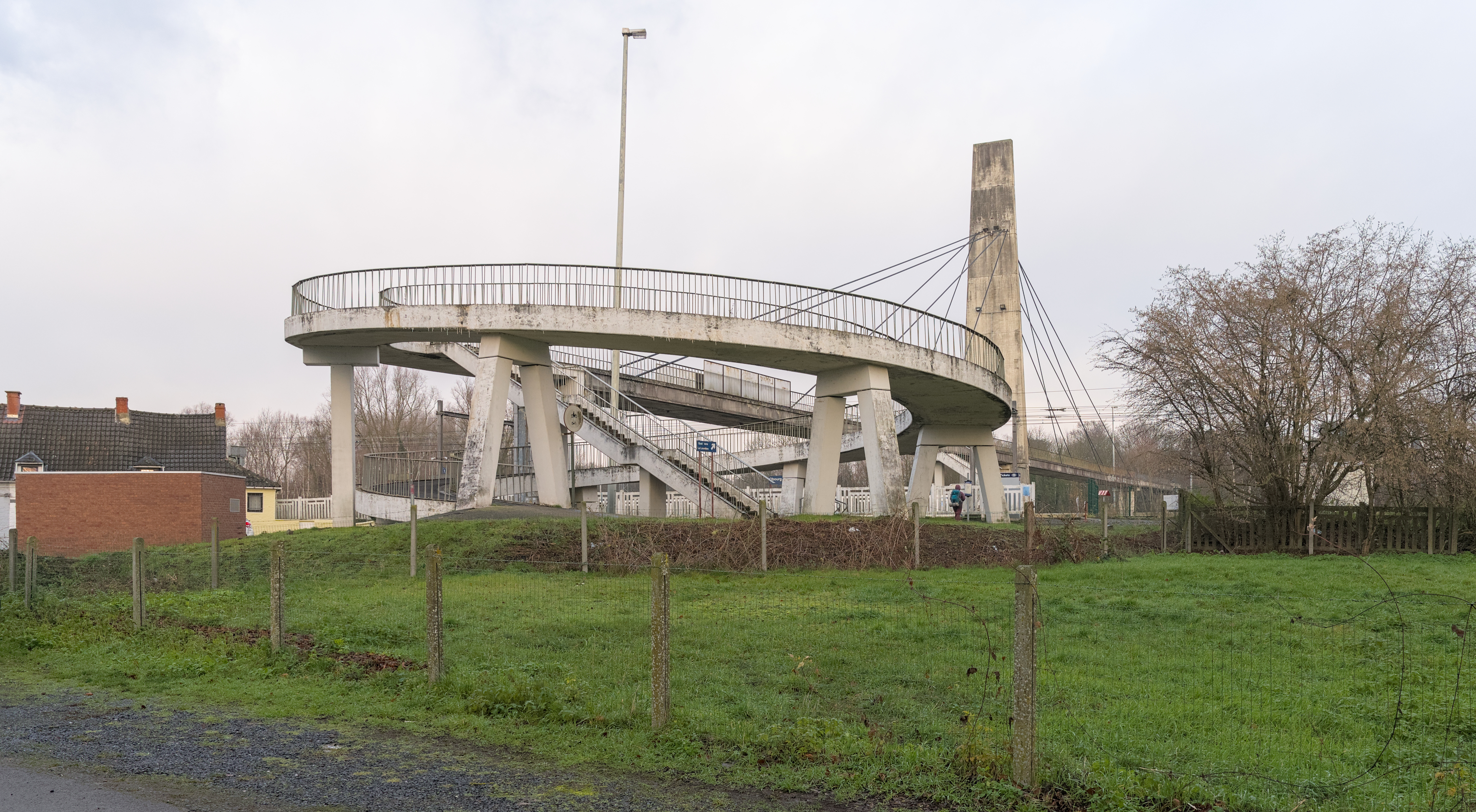
Obourg train station
