= Georg von Neufville =

German military officer and SA general (1883–1941)

Chief, SA Military Staff Supreme SA Leadership (OSAF)
- In office 1 June 1939 – 4 November 1941
- Preceded by: Position created
- Succeeded by: Thomas Girgensohn

Chief, SA Training Office (OSAF)
- In office 1936 – 31 May 1939

Personal details
- Born: 27 October 1883 Frankfurt, Kingdom of Prussia, German Empire
- Died: 3 November 1941 (aged 58) Panovo, Soviet Union
- Cause of death: Gunshot wound

Military service
- Allegiance: German Empire; Weimar Republic; Nazi Germany
- Branch/service: Imperial German Army; Freikorps; Reichswehr; Wehrmacht
- Years of service: 1902–1921; 1939–1941
- Rank: Major (Reichswehr); Generalmajor (Wehrmacht)
- Unit: 3rd Neumark Mounted Grenadiers; Life Guards Hussars
- Commands: 195th Infantry Regiment
- Battles/wars: World War I World War II: Battle of France; Operation Barbarossa; Battle of Moscow †
- Awards: Knight's Cross of the Iron Cross; Clasp to the Iron Cross, 1st and 2nd class

Georg Heinrich von Neufville (27 October 1883 – 3 November 1941) was a German military officer, a Freikorps leader, a member of the Nazi Party and an SA-Gruppenführer. He fought in both world wars, was killed in action fighting against the Red Army on the eastern front and was posthumously promoted to Generalmajor in the German Army.

== Early life ==
Neufville was born in Frankfurt, the son of a banker, and was descended from a very old noble family (originally from France) long prominent in the city's banking industry. Members of the family were also distinguished merchants, lawyers and military officers. In 1902, Neufville enlisted in the 3rd Neumark Mounted Grenadiers, a Royal Prussian Army regiment headquartered in Bromberg (today, Bydgoszcz). He entered military service as a Fahnenjunker (officer cadet) and was commissioned a Leutnant in 1903. He transferred to the Life Guards Hussar Regiment, headquartered in Potsdam, in 1910. He fought in the First World War and was promoted to Rittmeister on 8 November 1914. He advanced to a position on the General Staff and was awarded the Iron Cross, 1st and 2nd class.

At the war's end, Neufville founded and commanded the Neufville Volunteer Guard State Rifle Corps, a Freikorps unit that was involved in disarming the workers and soldiers council in Frankfurt, and that also participated in the Kapp Putsch against the Weimar Republic in April 1920. He was accepted into the peacetime Reichswehr and served in Wehrkreis III in Berlin, with the 6th Division in Münster and with the 2nd Cavalry Regiment. He was discharged from the military on 30 November 1921 with the rank of Major. Neufville lived in Schloss Aubach, worked as an estate farmer and married in 1923. He also became active in Der Stahlhelm, the German veterans association, becoming the state leader in Baden and Württemberg.

== Career in the Nazi Sturmabteilung (SA) ==
On 1 May 1933, Neufville joined the Nazi Party. He also joined its paramilitary organization, the Sturmabteilung (SA) with the rank of SA-Standartenführer. That year, he also was appointed executive president of the Reich Board of Trustees for Youth Education. Neufville worked in the Supreme SA Leadership (OSAF) in Munich and, by 1936, was an SA-Oberführer and the head of the SA-Ausbildungsamt (training office). In the parliamentary election on 29 March 1936, he unsuccessfully applied for a mandate to the Reichstag. On 10 April 1938, he was promoted to SA-Brigadeführer. On 1 June 1939, the SA established the SA-Wehrstab (SA military staff) charged with conducting military training for the SA staff in cooperation with the Wehrmacht. Neufvillef was commissioned by SA-Stabschef Viktor Lutze with heading this new office.

== Second World War ==
After the outbreak of the Second World War in September 1939, Neufville returned to military service. He served as a battalion commander with the 195th Infantry Regiment in the Battle of France in May and June 1940. On 15 December 1940, he was appointed commander of the regiment and was promoted to Oberst. He also was promoted to SA-Gruppenführer on 30 January 1941. In June 1941, he led his regiment in Operation Barbarossa, the invasion of the Soviet Union. He earned the Clasp to the Iron Cross, 1st and 2nd class and, on 22 September 1941, he was awarded the Knight's Cross of the Iron Cross. Neufville was seriously wounded by a gunshot to the chest on 3 November 1941 in the Mihailovskoye district, during the Battle of Moscow. He died the following day at the main first aid station in Panovo. He was posthumously promoted to Generalmajor.

== Sources ==
- Campbell, Bruce (1998). The SA Generals and the Rise of Nazism. Lexington: University Press of Kentucky. ISBN 978-0-813-12047-8.
- Fellgiebel, Walther-Peer (2000) [1986]. Die Träger des Ritterkreuzes des Eisernen Kreuzes 1939–1945 — Die Inhaber der höchsten Auszeichnung des Zweiten Weltkrieges aller Wehrmachtteile [The Bearers of the Knight's Cross of the Iron Cross 1939–1945 — The Owners of the Highest Award of the Second World War of all Wehrmacht Branches] (in German). Friedberg, Germany: Podzun-Pallas. ISBN 978-3-7909-0284-6.
- Neufville, Georg von in the Frankfurter Personenlexicon
- Neufville, Georg Heinrich von in the Hessian Regional History Information System (LAGIS)
- Siemens, Daniel (2017). Stormtroopers: A New History of Hitler's Brownshirts. New Haven: Yale University Press. ISBN 978-0-300-19681-8.
- von Neufville, Georg Heinrich in the Lexicon der Wehrmacht
