= Neufvilles =

Coordinates: 50°34′06″N 4°00′11″E

Neufvilles (Walloon: Neuvile) is a village of Wallonia and a district of the municipality of Soignies, located in the province of Hainaut, Belgium.

Since 1977, Neufvilles has been part of the municipality of Soignies, which also comprises the villages Casteau, Horrues, Chaussée-Notre-Dame-Louvignies, Naast, Soignies (town), and Thieusies.

== Gallery ==
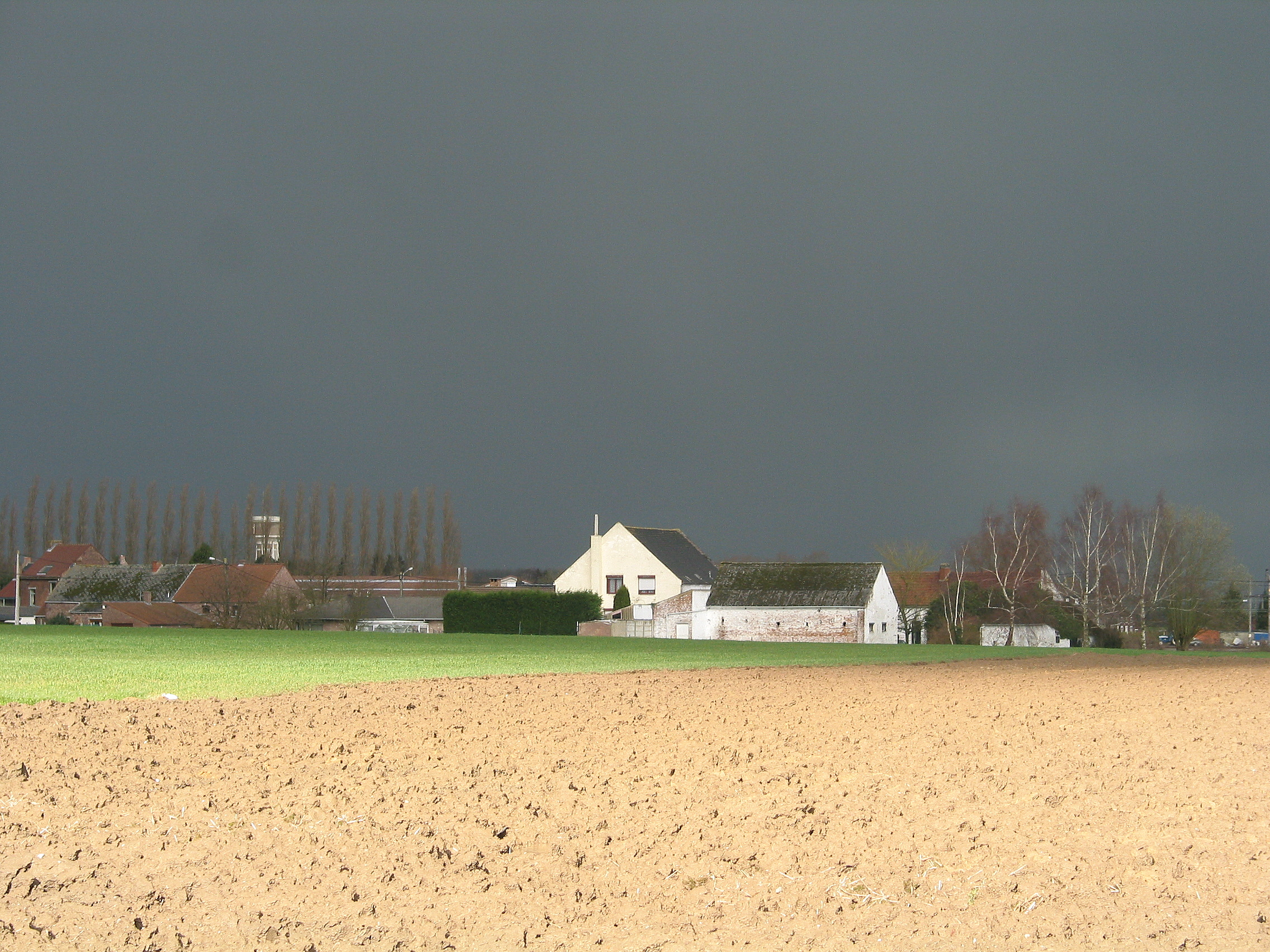
Neufvilles, "La Gage".

== See also ==
- Neufville
