= Chaussée-Notre-Dame-Louvignies =

Village and district in Belgium

Coordinates: 50°35′33″N 3°59′53″E

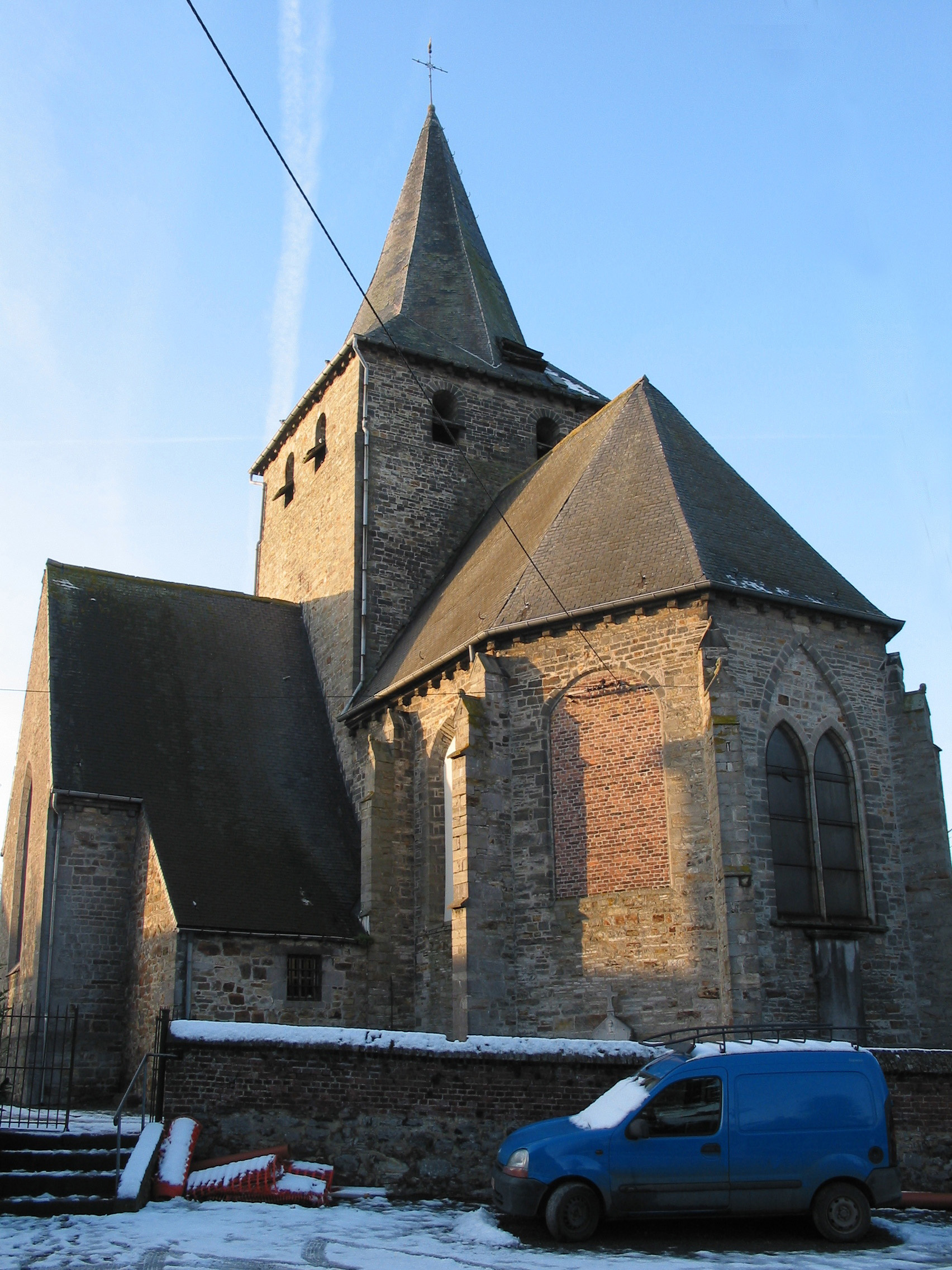
Chaussée-Notre-Dame-Louvignies

Chaussée-Notre-Dame-Louvignies (French pronunciation: [ʃose nɔtʁə dam luviɲi]; Picard: El Caussêye) is a village of Wallonia and a district of the municipality of Soignies, located in the province of Hainaut, Belgium.

With the other villages Casteau, Horrues, Naast, Neufvilles, Soignies (town), and Thieusies, it composes the municipality of Soignies since 1977.

== Gallery ==
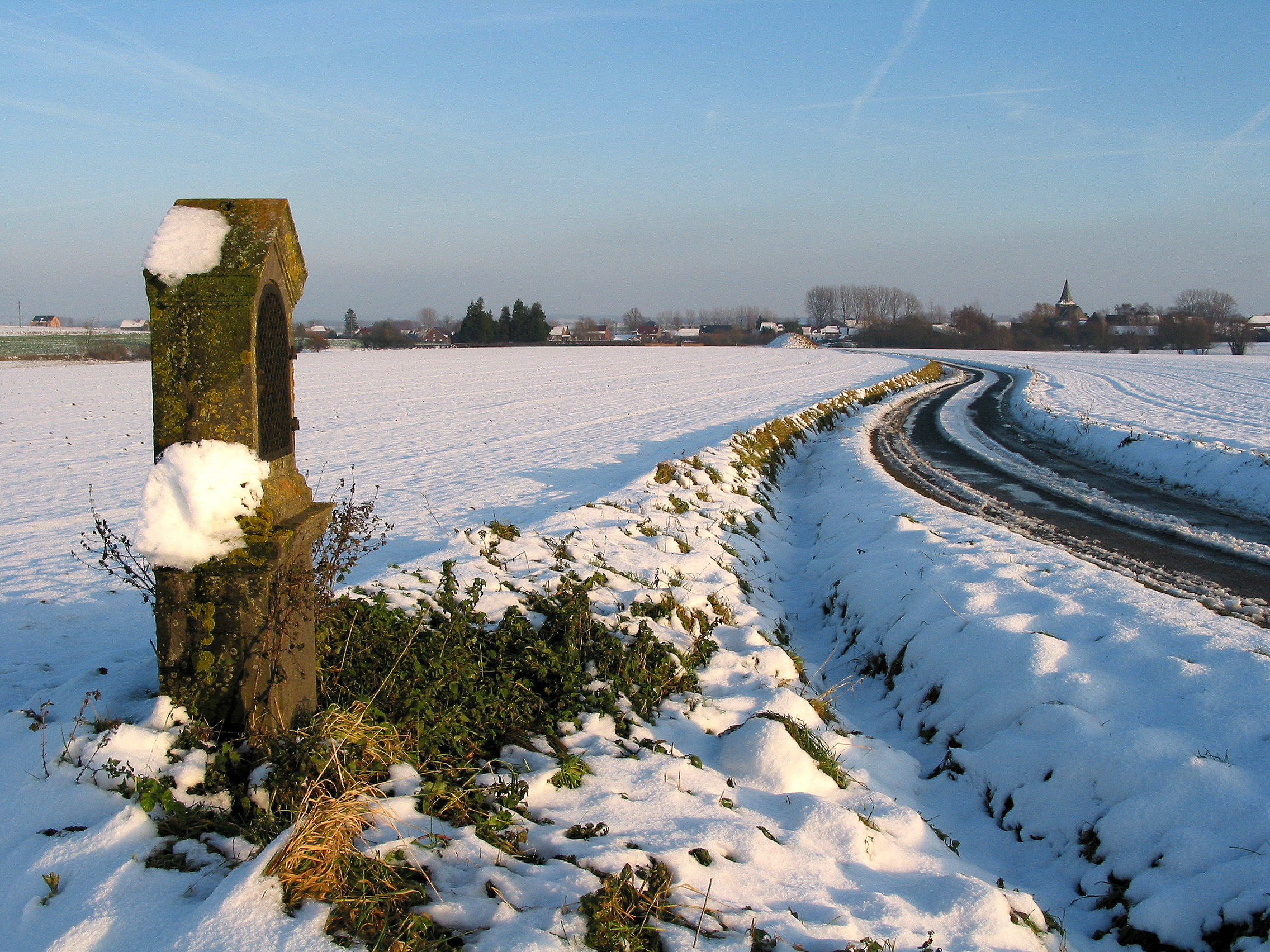
Rue du Fouly street

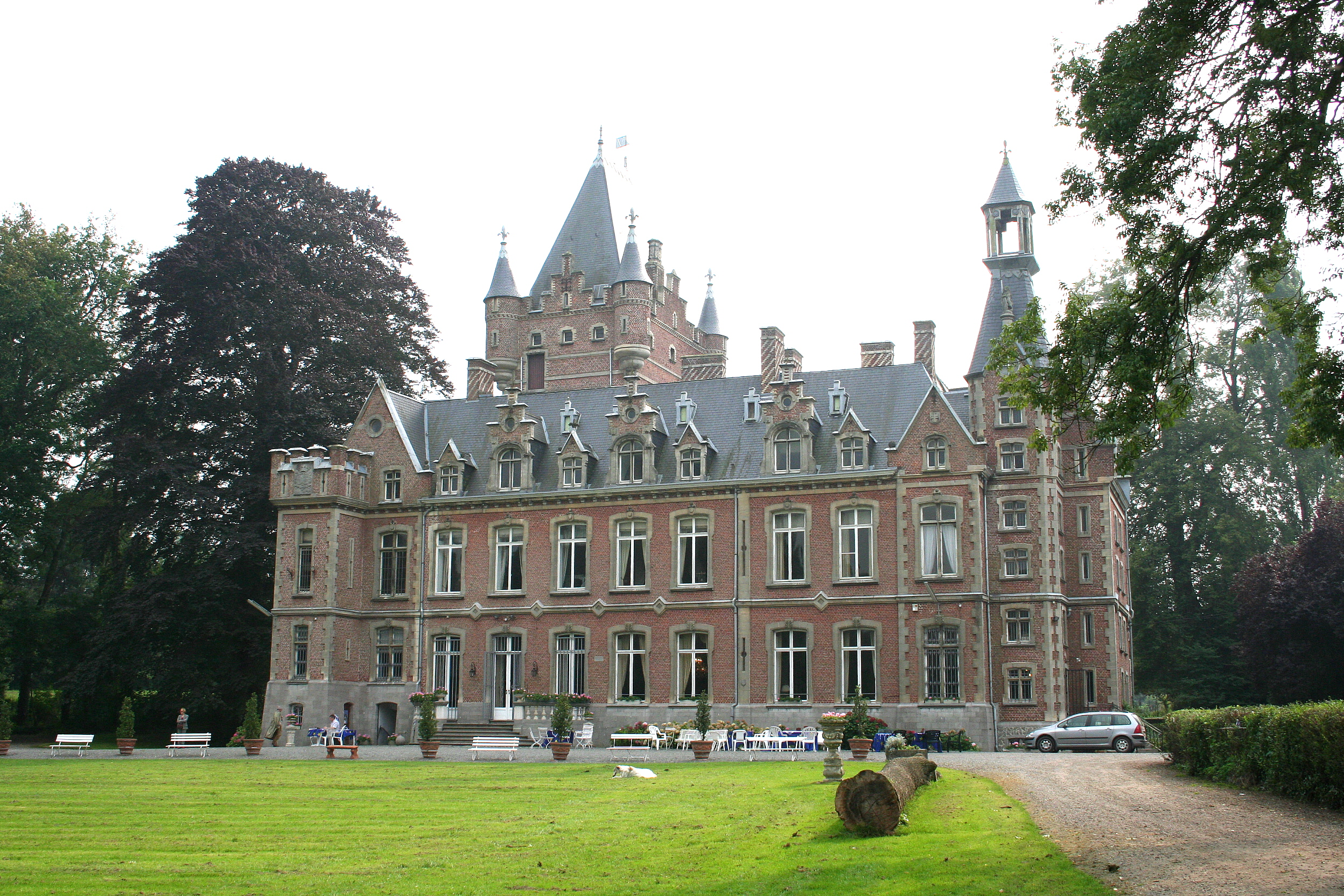
"Villegas" castle (1870)

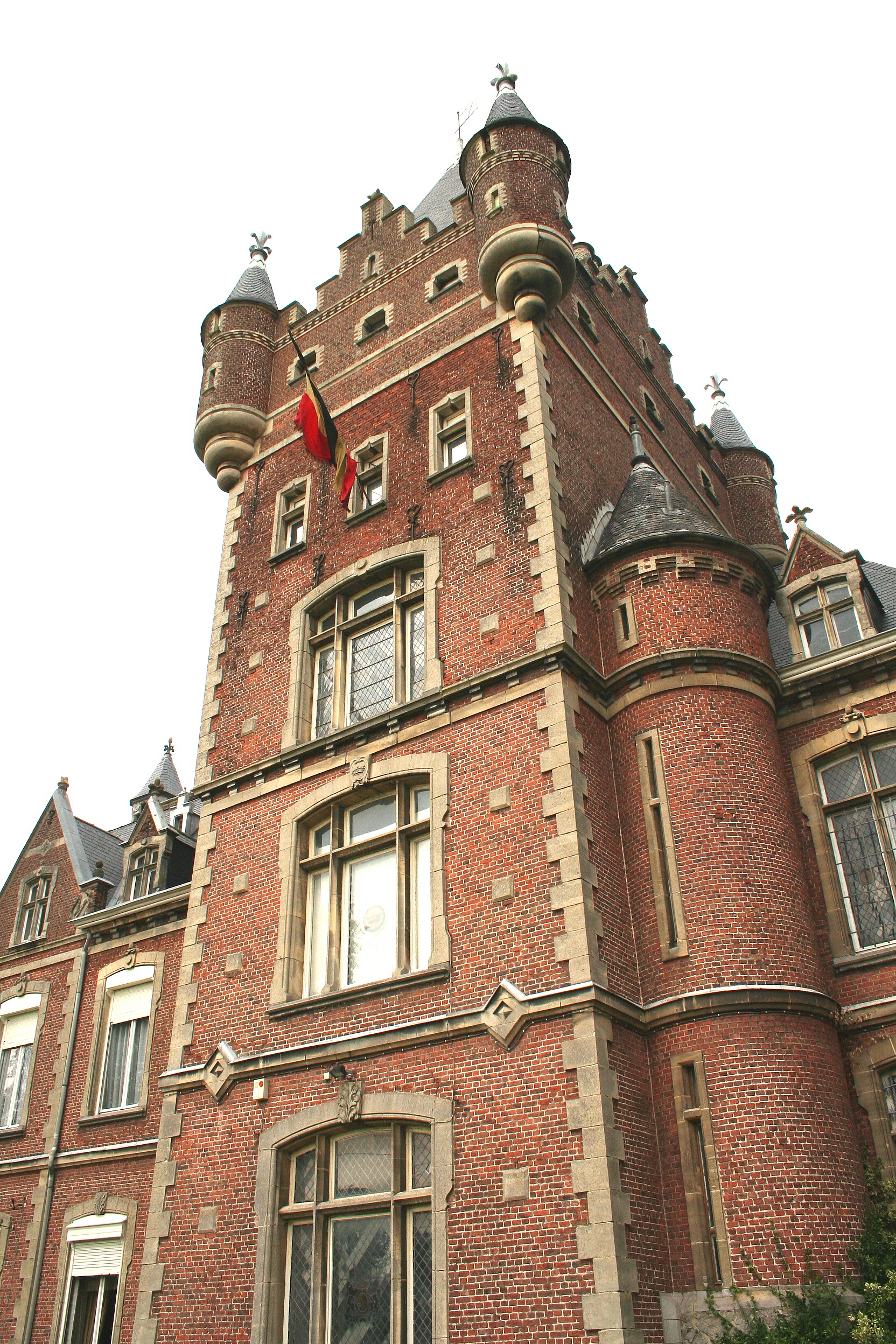
"Villegas" castle tower

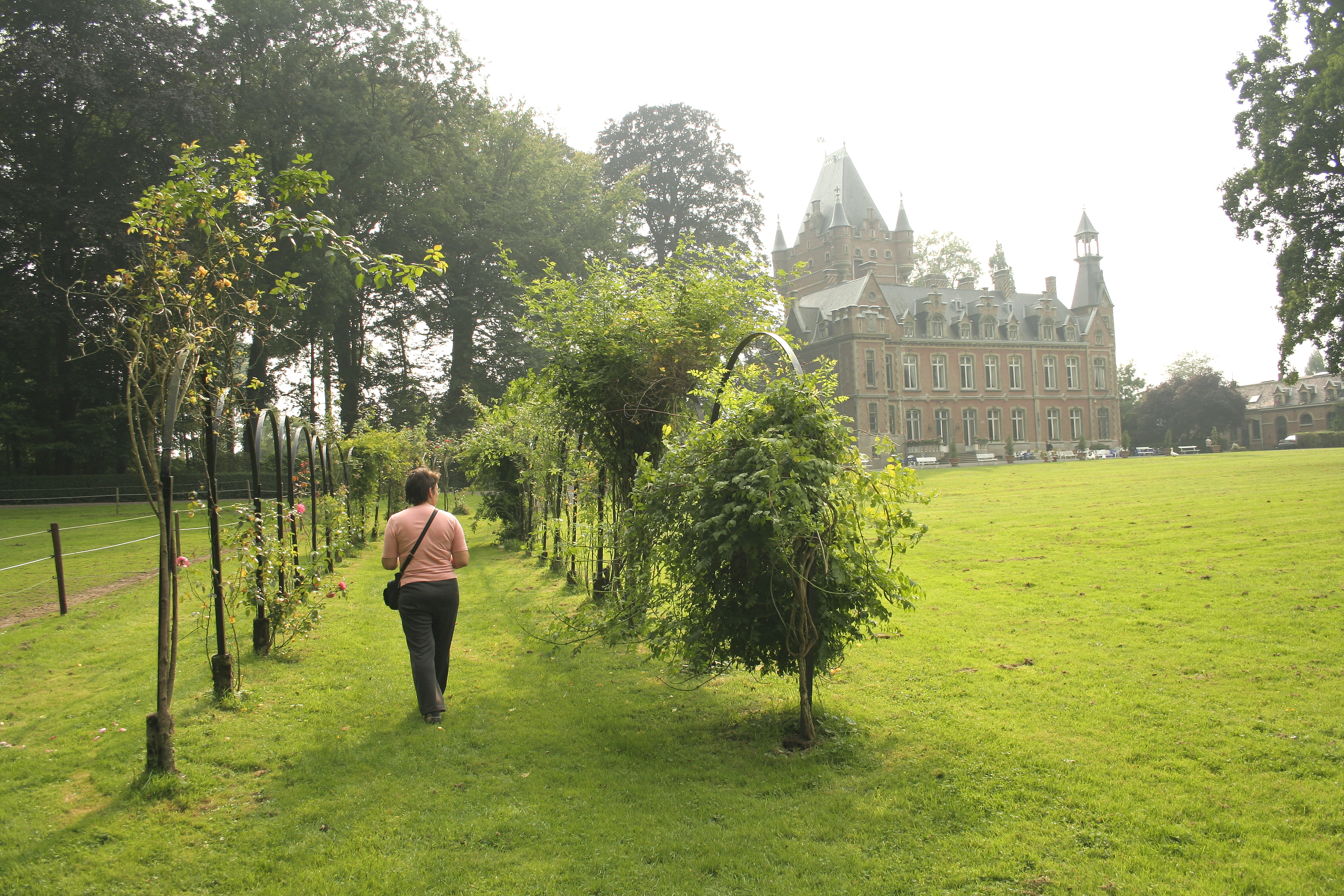
"Villegas" castle and park
