= Naast, Soignies =

Naast (Walloon: Nåsse) is a village of Wallonia and a district of the municipality of Soignies, located in the province of Hainaut, Belgium, known by the wellspring of the river Zenne.

Its population continued to increase throughout the nineteenth century. In 1972 a city was built to address the housing crisis but also to maintain a young population in Naast who tended to emigrate.

Since 1977, Naast and the villages Casteau, Horrues, Chaussée-Notre-Dame-Louvignies, Neufvilles, Soignies (town) (Zinnik), and Thieusies compose the municipality of Soignies.

== Etymology ==
Naast was mentioned for the first time in 1119 or 1225. For some it would come from the Germanic "Knasque" which means soft, wet or swampy ground. For others, this name would come from a Germanic word meaning "nearest".

== History ==
In the Middle Ages, the lordship of Naast was very important. It passed to count du Hainaut in 1339.

In 1830 the industry itself did not exist in Naast, but rather crafts. There was a tuilery, a distillery, two flour mills, three iron marshals, a charron, a cooper, a wooden turret, etc.

At the end of the 19th century agriculture occupied an important place in economic life. The trade in these products had developed mainly thanks to the railway that passed through the village. There was a mustard factory and two quarries for the extraction of blue stone, probably opened in 1897.

== Gallery ==
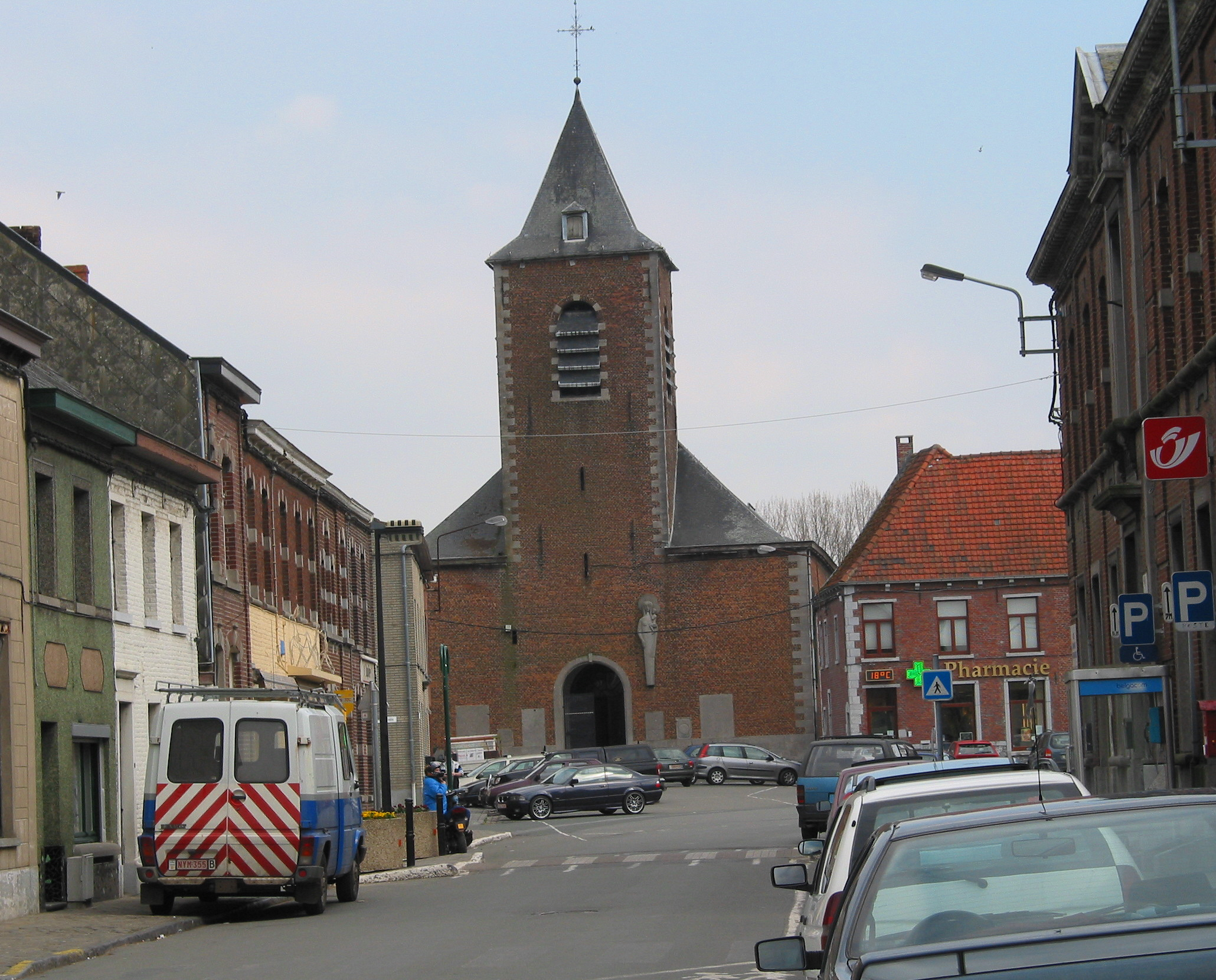
Naast, The church.
