= Horrues =

Village and district in Belgium

Coordinates: 50°36′29″N 4°02′26″E

- Village
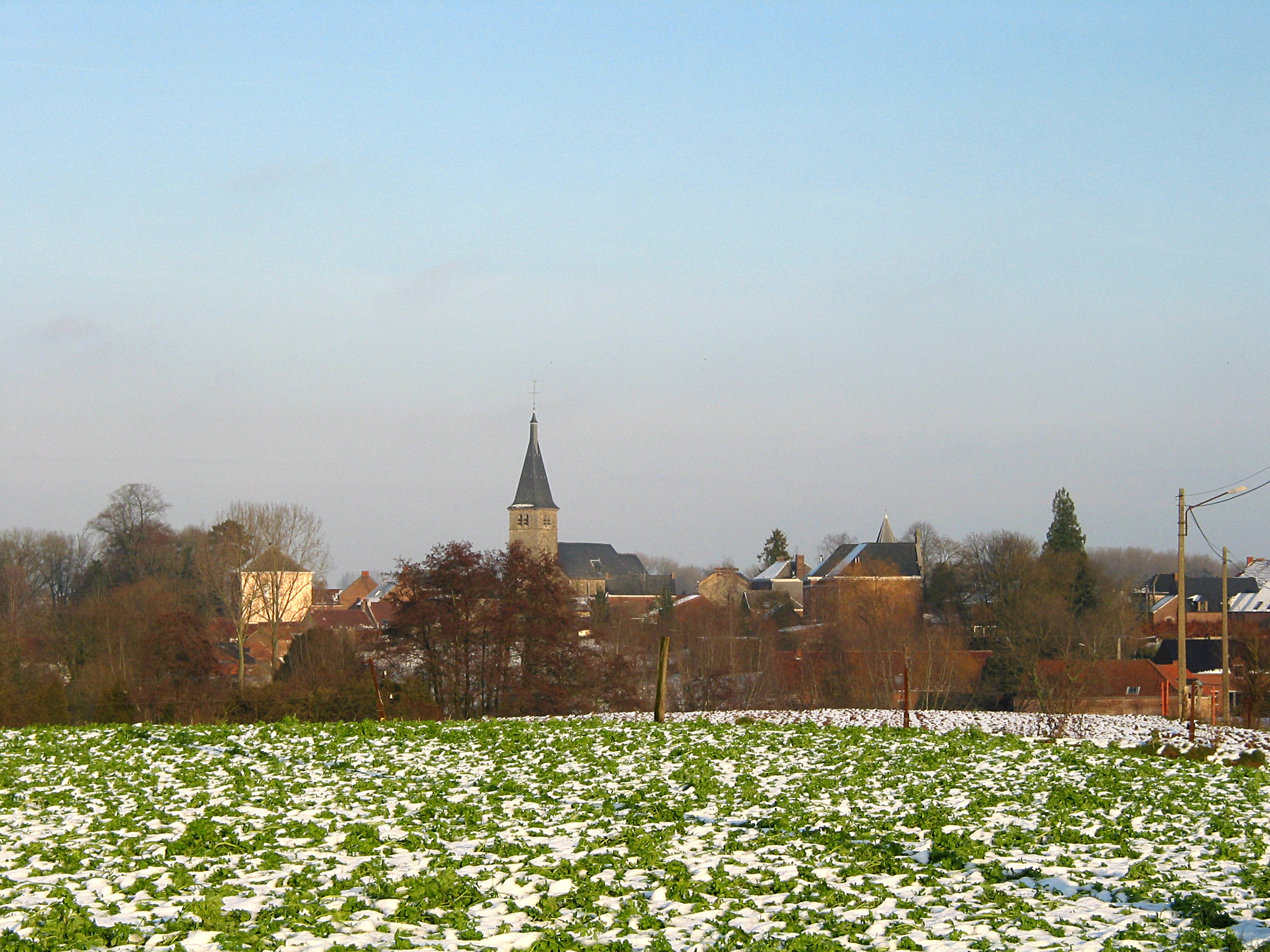
- Horrues
- Interactive map of Horrues
- Sovereign State: Belgium
- Region: Wallonia
- Province: Hainaut
- Municipality: Soignies
- Time zone: UTC+1 (Central European Time)
  - Summer (DST): UTC+2 (Central European Summer Time)

Horrues (French pronunciation: [ɔʁy]; Walloon: Orû) is a village of Wallonia and a district of the municipality of Soignies, located in the province of Hainaut, Belgium.

Since 1977, it has composed the municipality of Soignies along with the others villages Casteau, Chaussée-Notre-Dame-Louvignies, Naast, Neufvilles, Soignies (town), and Thieusies.

== Gallery ==
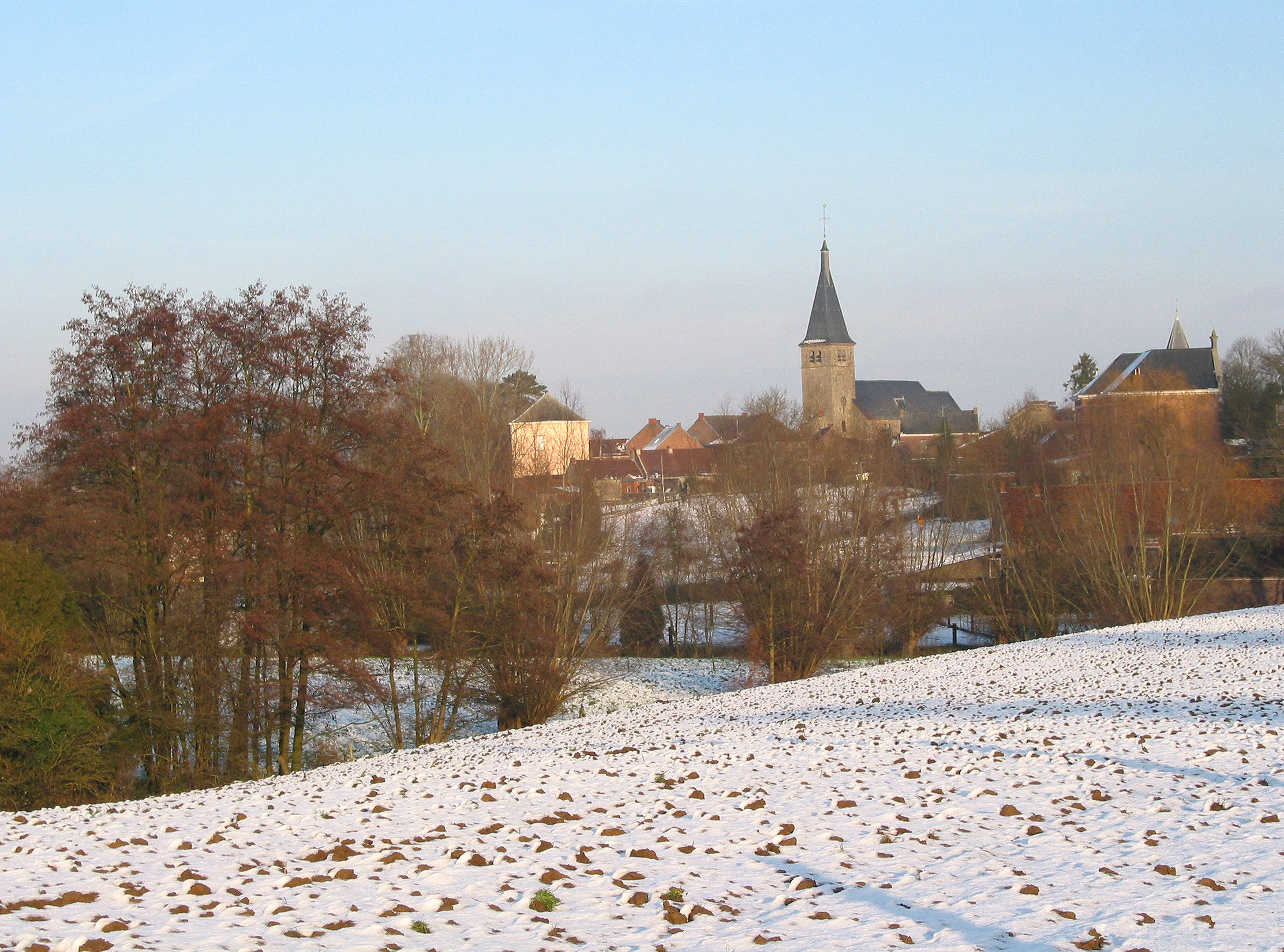
Village in winter

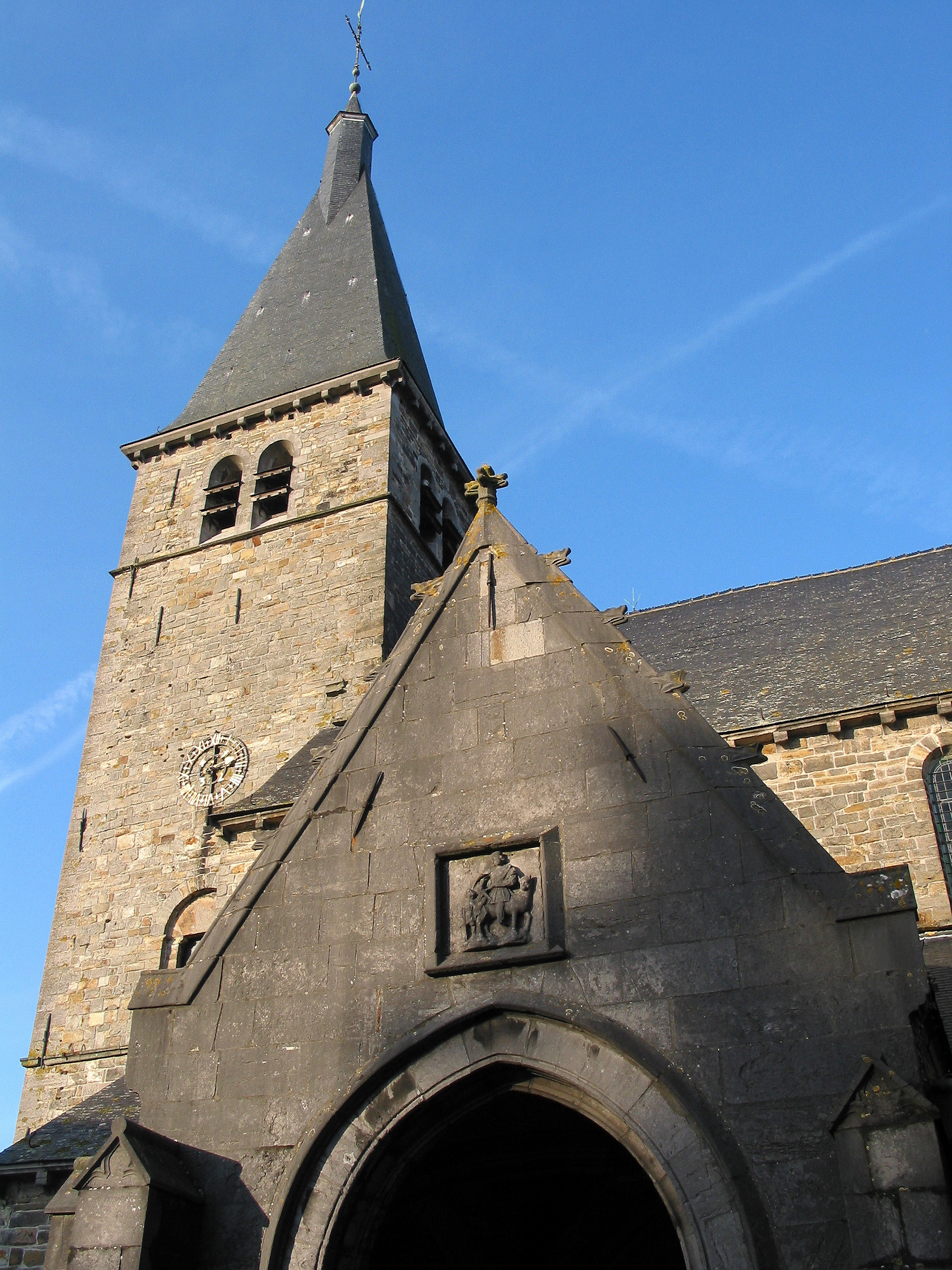
Church Saint-Martin

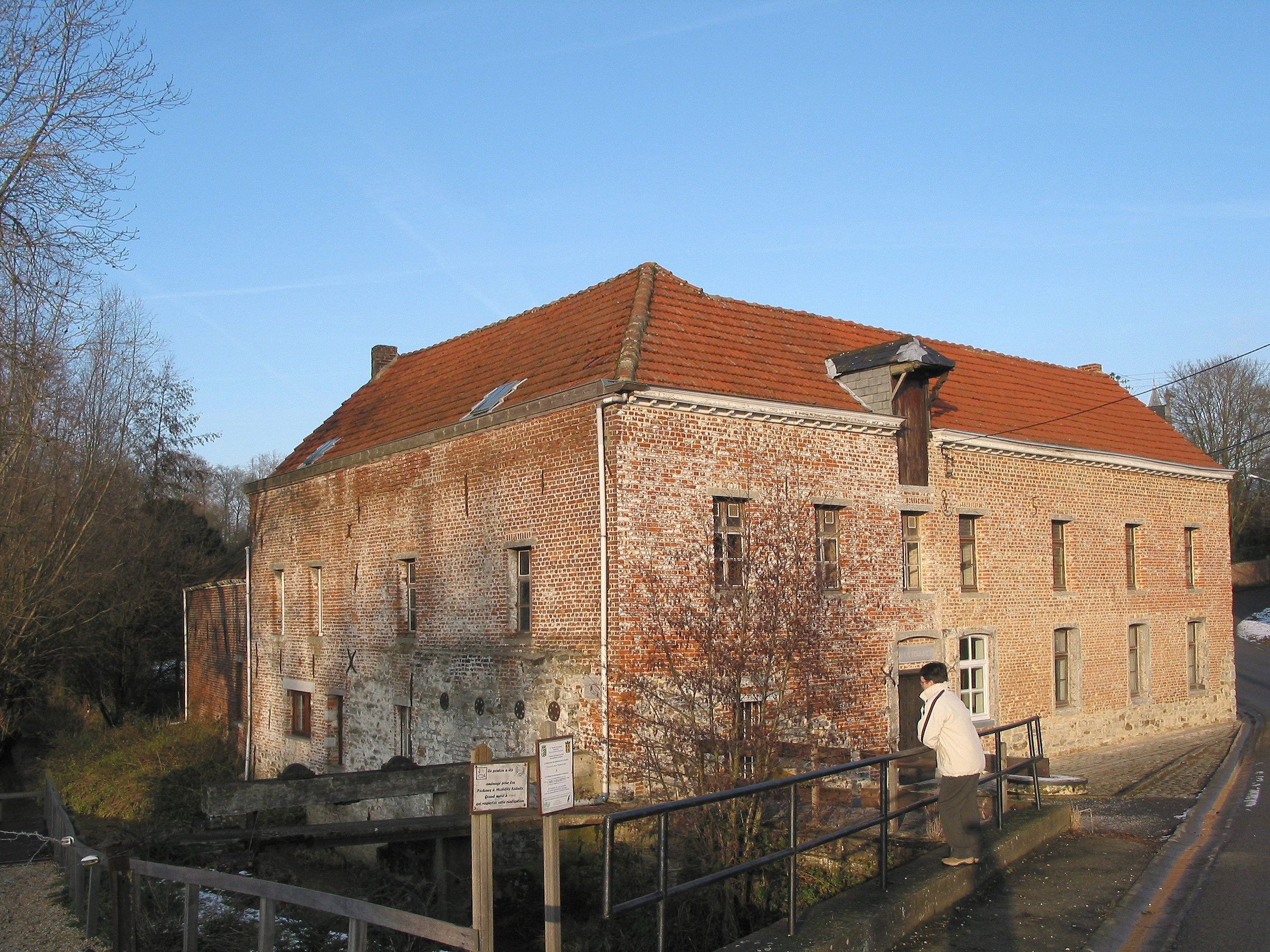
Water mill Le Moulinet
