= Thieusies =

Thieusies Tieuziye (Walloon)
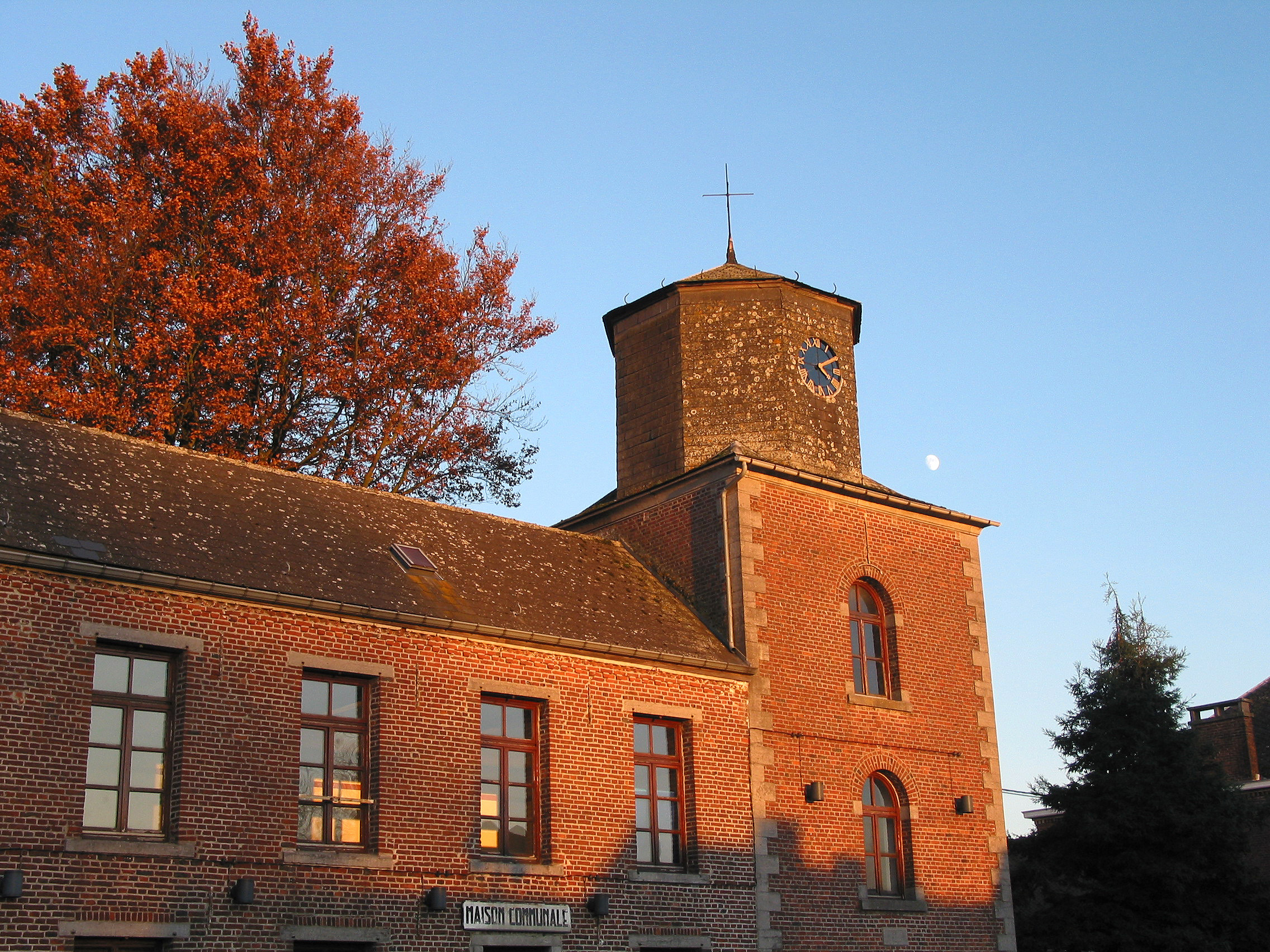
- Thieusies, Old Town hall.

- Coat of arms
- Interactive map of Thieusies
- Coordinates: 50°30′55″N 4°02′57″E
- Country: Belgium
- Region: Wallonia
- Province: Hainaut
- Municipality: Soignies
- Website: www.soignies.be

Thieusies (French pronunciation: [tjøzi]; Walloon: Tieuziye) is a village of Wallonia and a district of the municipality of Soignies, located in the province of Hainaut, Belgium.

Since 1977, Thieusies formed part of the municipality of Soignies, also comprising the villages of Casteau, Horrues, Chaussée-Notre-Dame-Louvignies, Naast, Neufvilles, and Soignies (town).

== Gallery ==
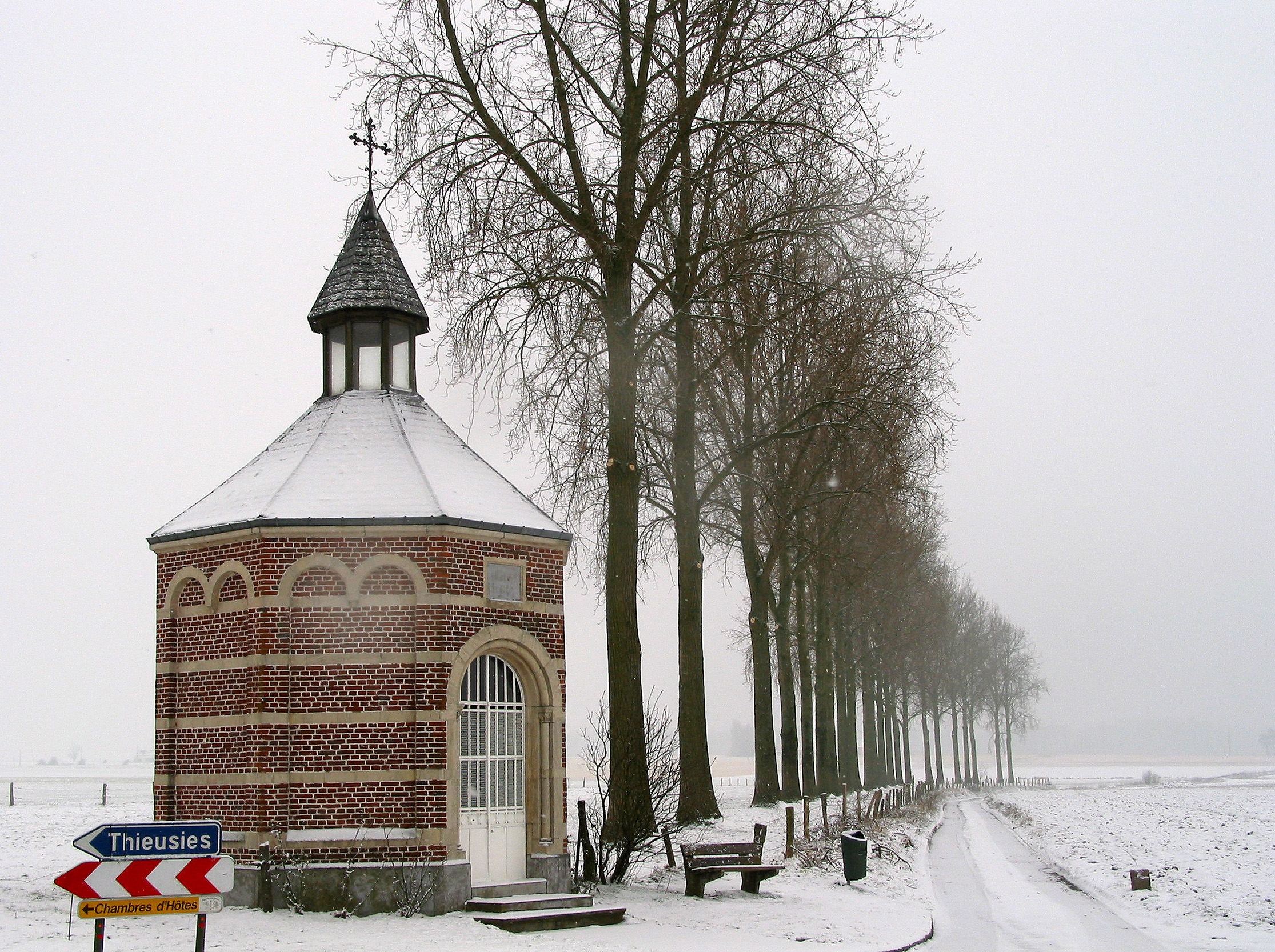
Village in winter.

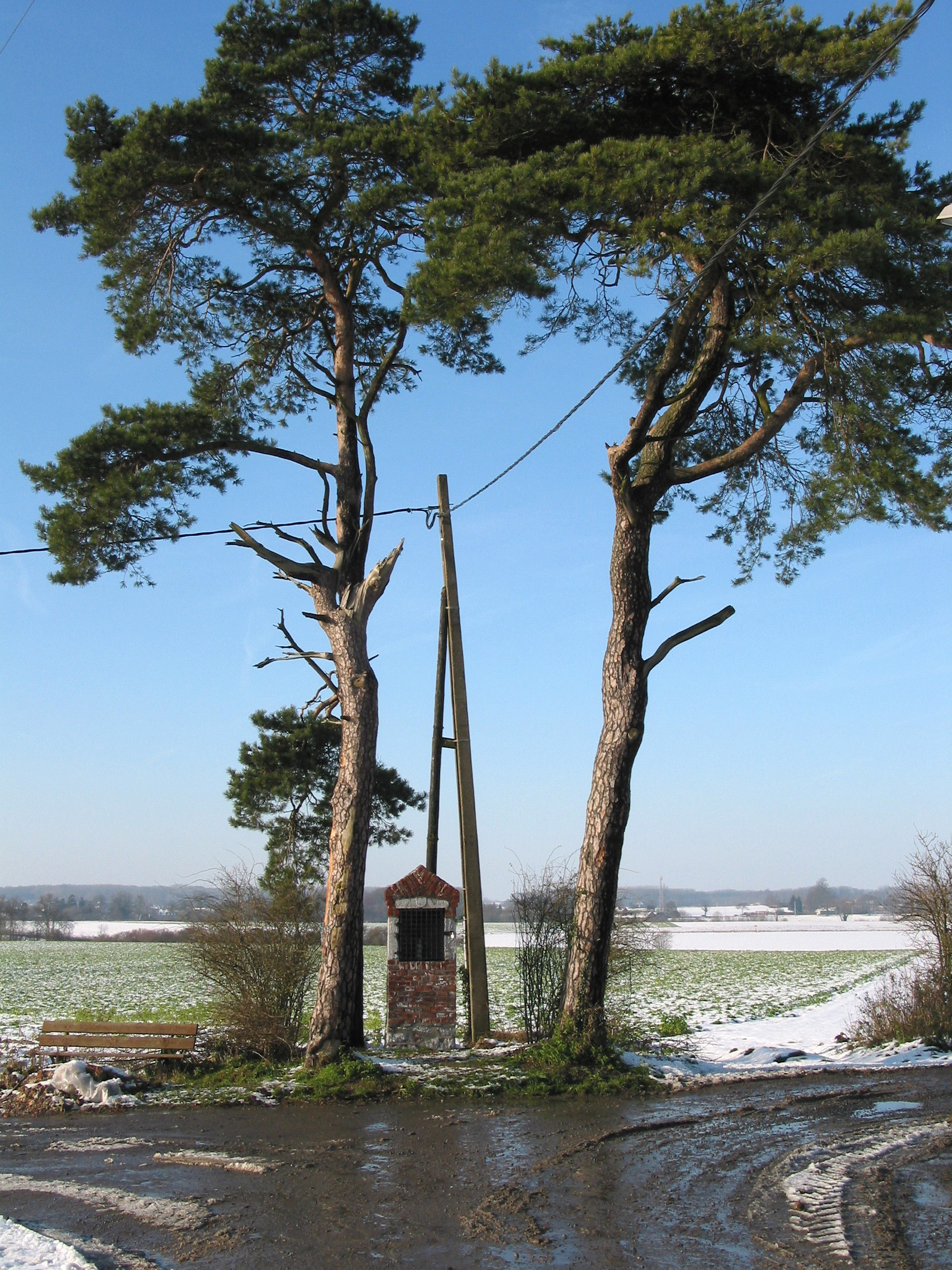
Village in winter.

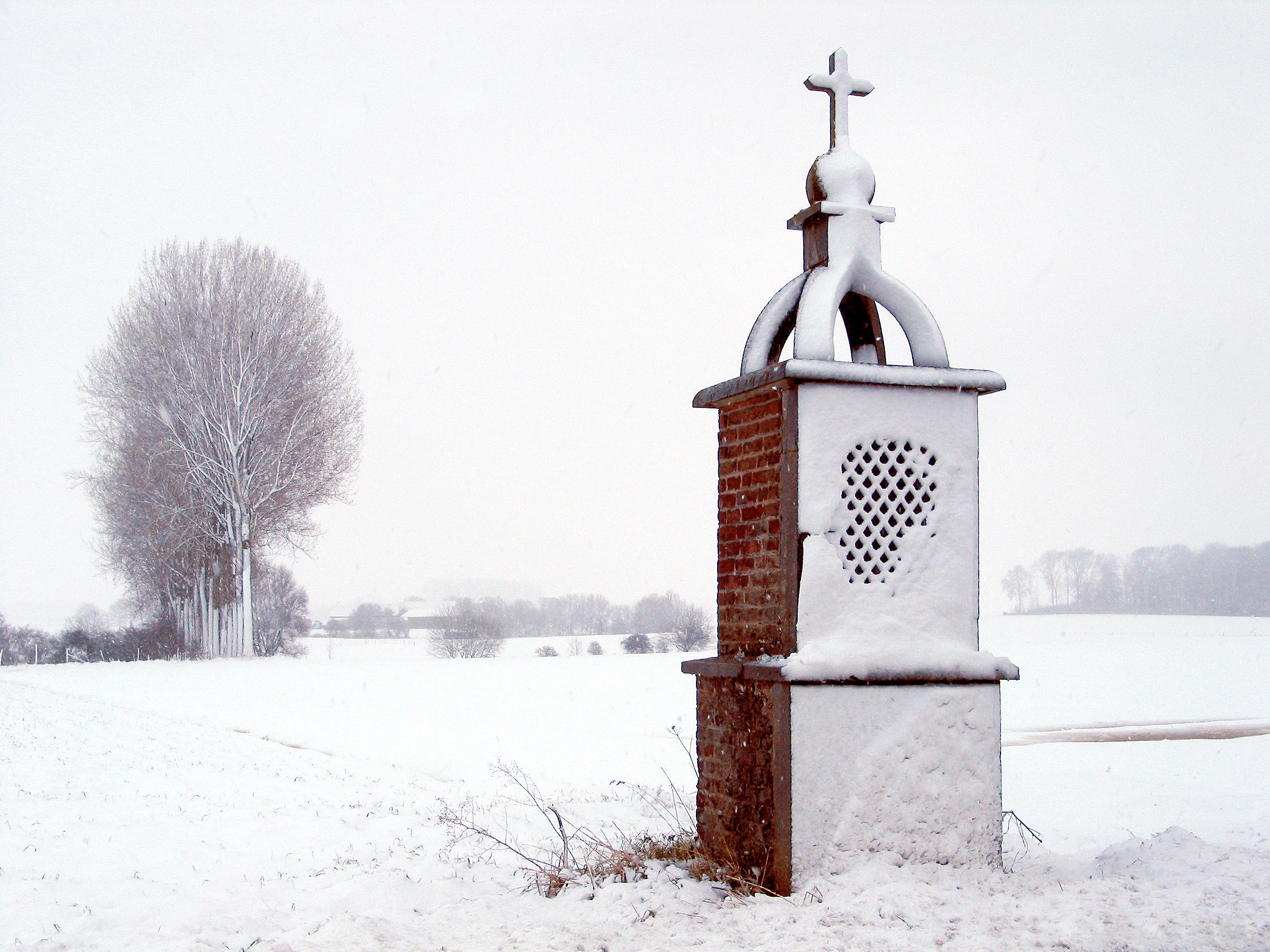
Village in winter.

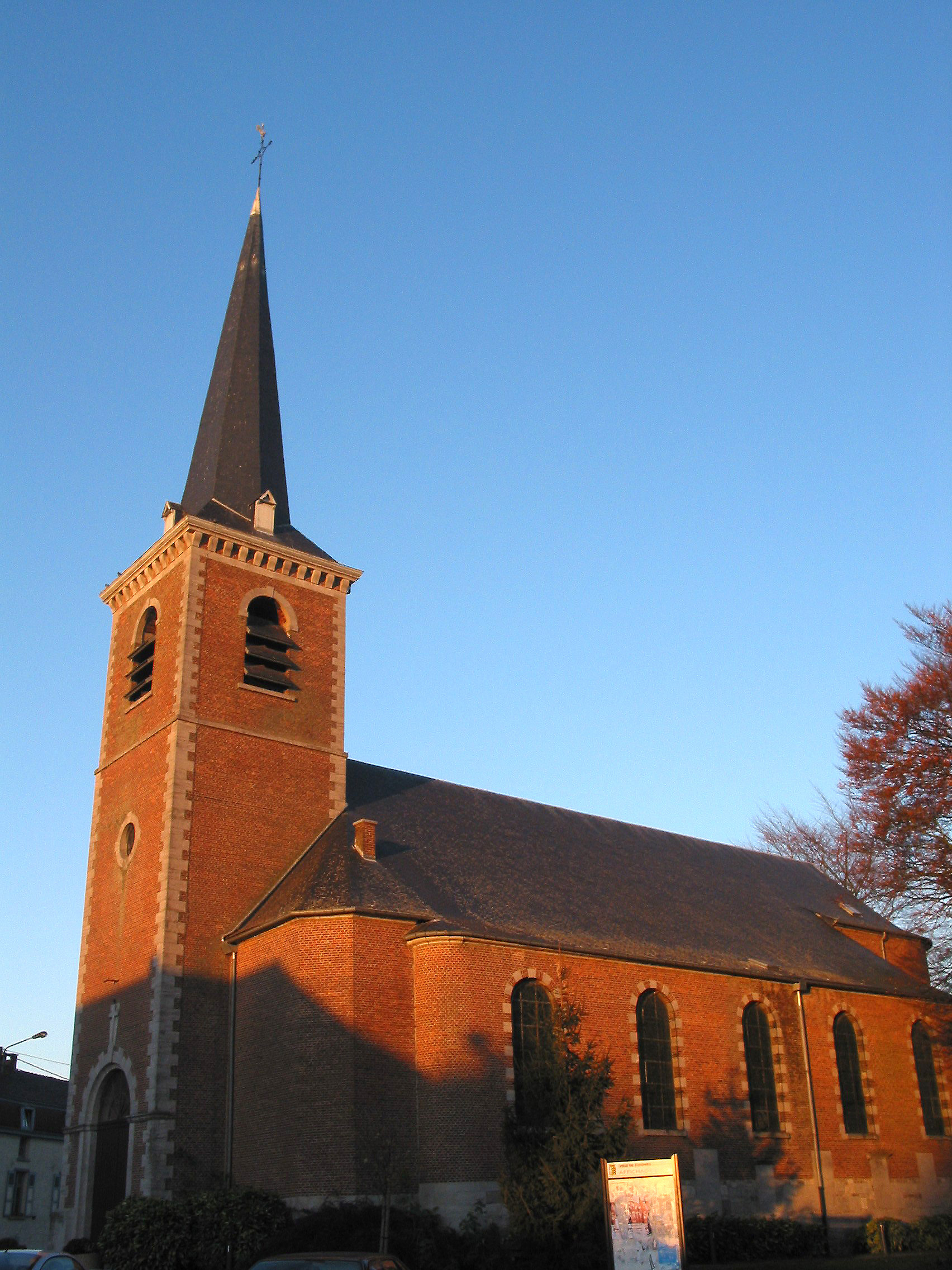
Thieusies, Church Saint-Pierre.

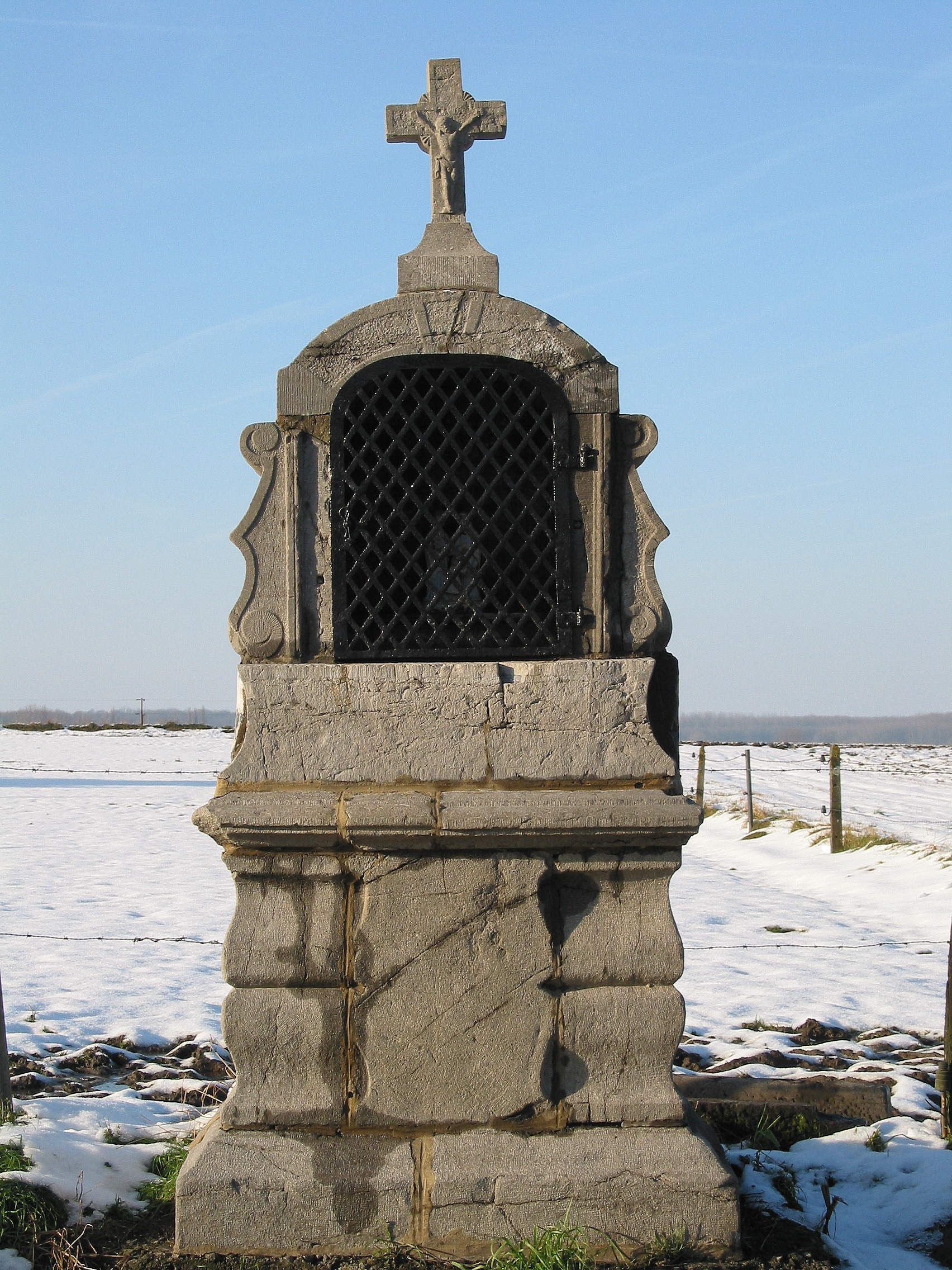
Chapel Sainte Famille.

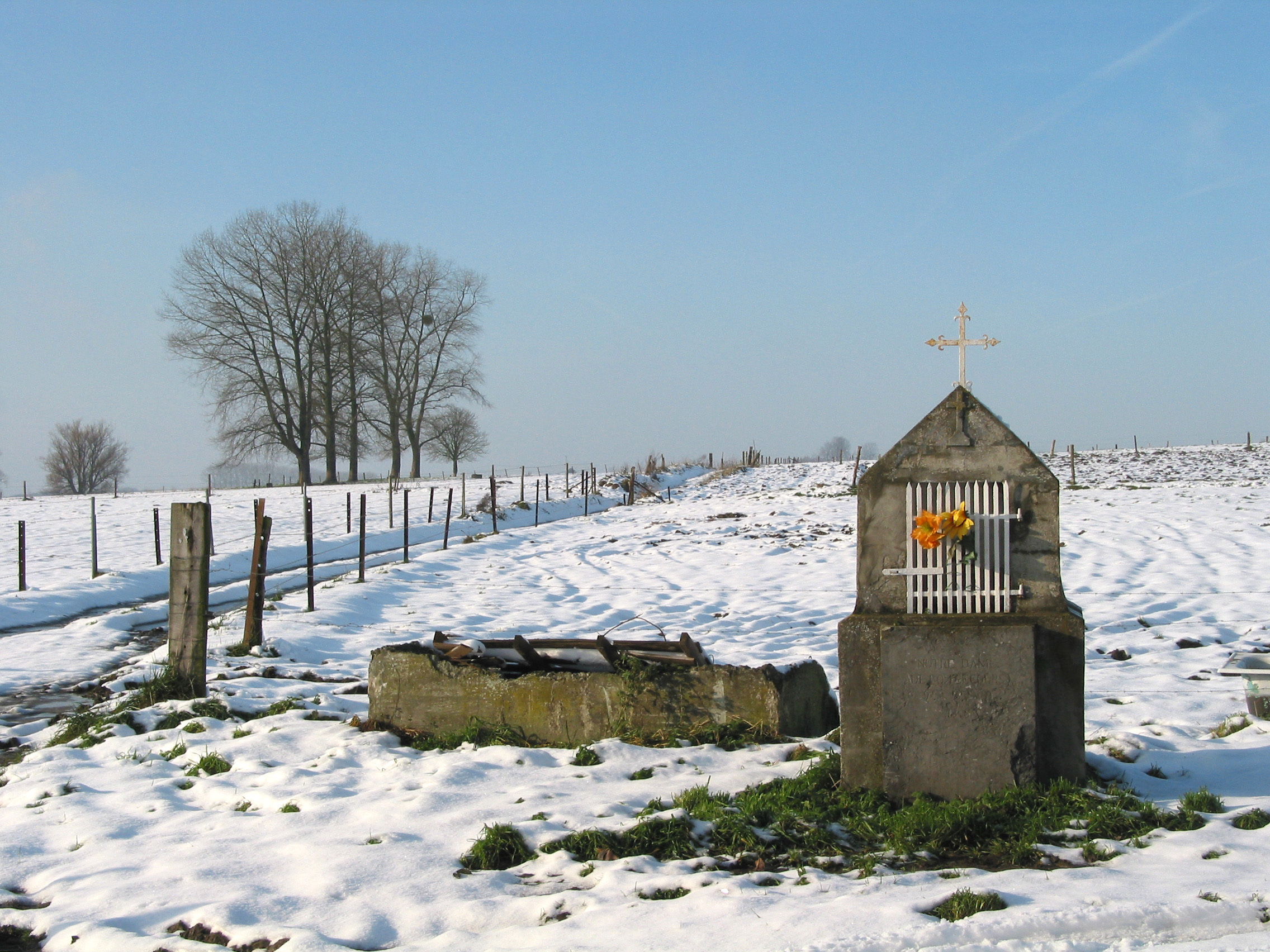
Chapel Notre Dame de Bon-Secours.

== Chateau de Thieusies ==
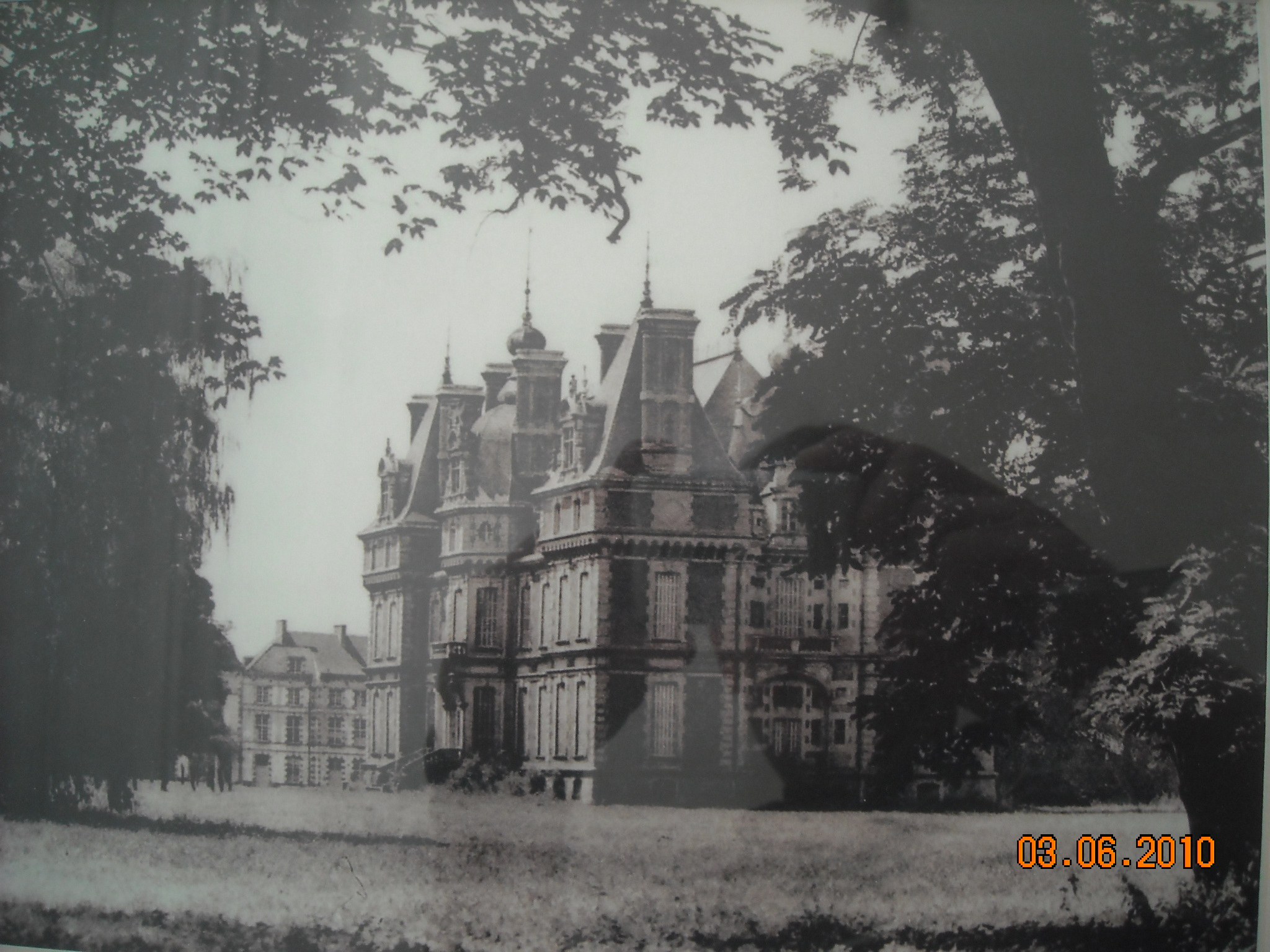
Chateau de Thieusies before demolition.

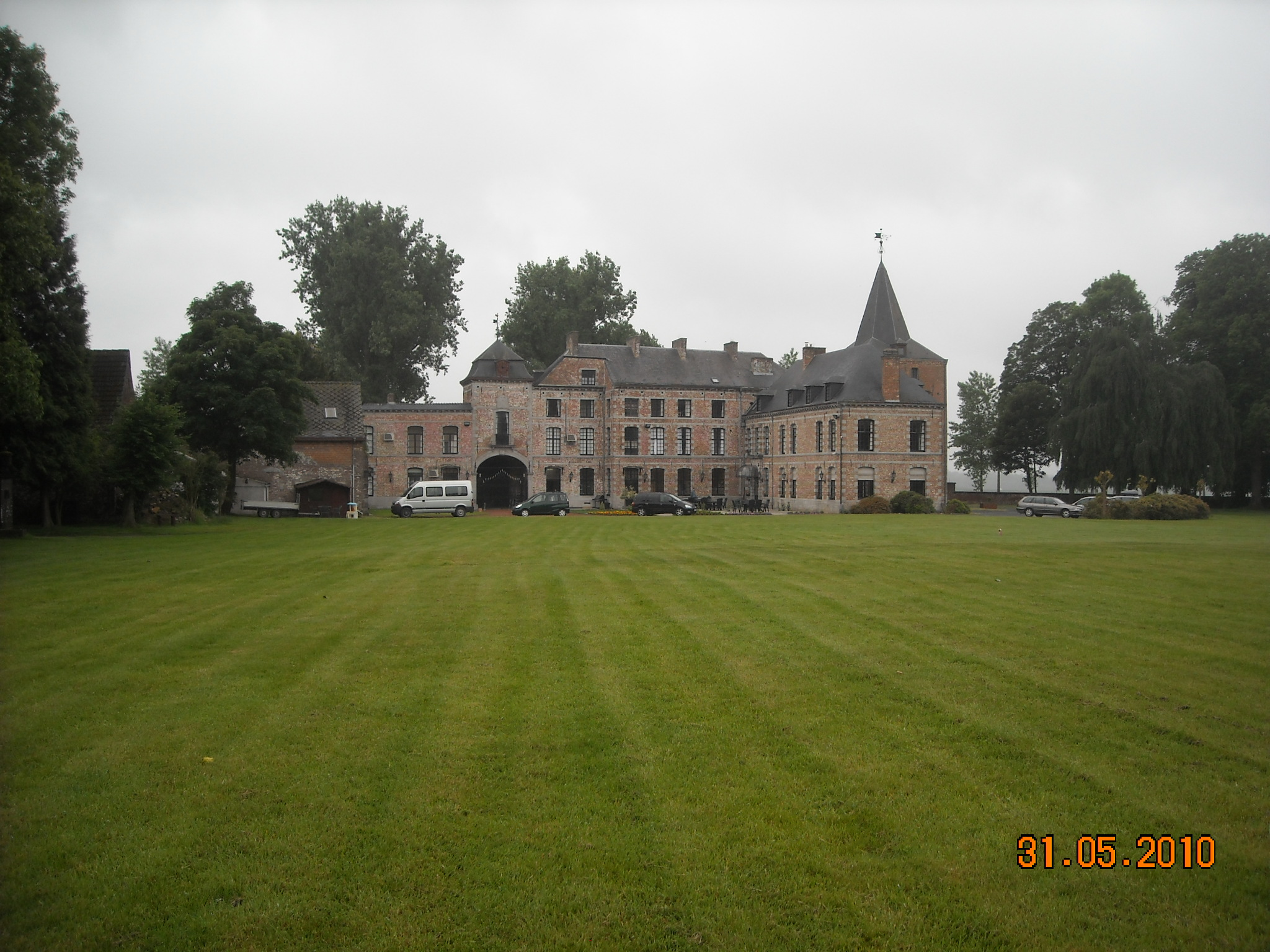
Chateau de Thieusies today.
