= Panovo, Vladimir Oblast =

Panovo Паново
- Village
- Location within Vladimir Oblast Location within Russia
- Coordinates: 55°20′N 41°48′E
- Country: Russia
- Region: Vladimir Oblast
- District: Melenkovsky District
- Time zone: UTC+3:00

Panovo (Russian: Пано́во) is a rural locality (a village) in Lyakhovskoye Rural Settlement, Melenkovsky District, Vladimir Oblast, Russia. The population was 481 as of 2010. There are 4 streets.

== Geography ==
Panovo is located 12 km east of Melenki (the district's administrative centre) by road. Dubtsy is the nearest rural locality.
