= Soignies =

Municipality in Hainaut Province, Wallonia, Belgium

Soignies Sougniye (Picard): Zinnik (Dutch)
- Municipality
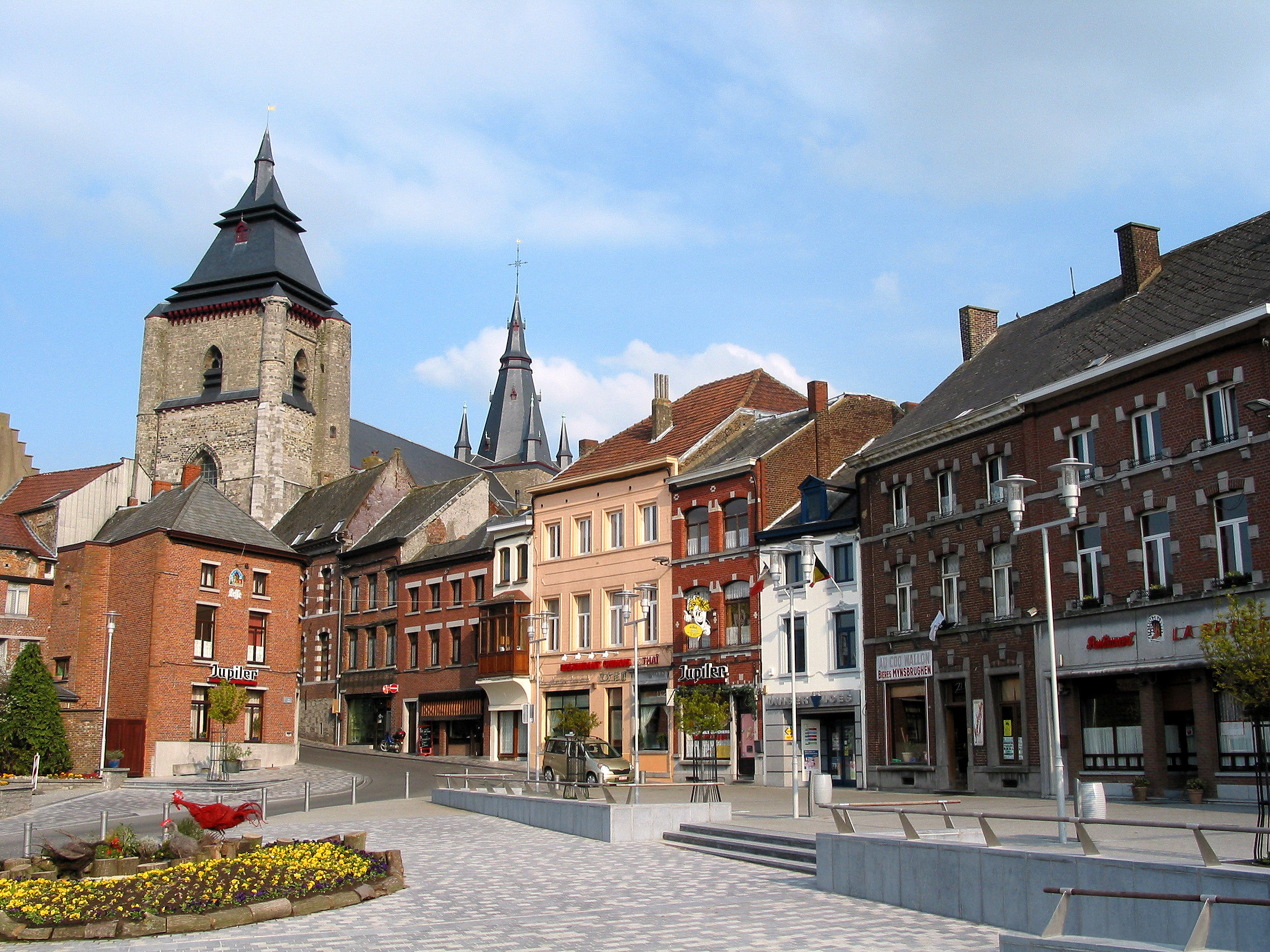
- The Collegiate Church of St. Vincent (10th century) and the Place Verte

- Flag Coat of arms

- Location of Soignies in Hainaut
- Interactive map of Soignies
- Location in Belgium
- Coordinates: 50°34′N 04°04′E
- Country: Belgium
- Community: French Community
- Region: Wallonia
- Province: Hainaut
- Arrondissement: Soignies

Government
  - Mayor: Fabienne Winckel (PS)
  - Governing parties: PS, MR, Ecolo

Area
  - Total: 111.27 km^{2} (42.96 sq mi)

Population (2018-01-01)
  - Total: 27,603
  - Density: 248.07/km^{2} (642.50/sq mi)
- Postal codes: 7060-7063
- NIS code: 55040
- Area codes: 065/067
- Website: www.soignies.be

Soignies (French pronunciation: [swaɲi]; Dutch: Zinnik, pronounced [ˈzɪnɪk]; Picard: Sougniye; Walloon: Sougniye) is a municipality of Wallonia located in the province of Hainaut, Belgium.

It consists of the following districts: Casteau, Chaussée-Notre-Dame-Louvignies, Horrues, Naast, Neufvilles, Soignies and Thieusies. Casteau is known worldwide because SHAPE, the military headquarters of NATO, has been based at the village since 1967.

The name of Soignies comes from the Latin word suniacum, which means "on the Senne". The spring of the Senne is near Soignies. After Soignies, the river flows through Brussels.

Soignies is also well known for its blue limestone (from the Carrières du Hainaut) and its glass industry (Durobor).

== History ==
=== Saint Vincent ===
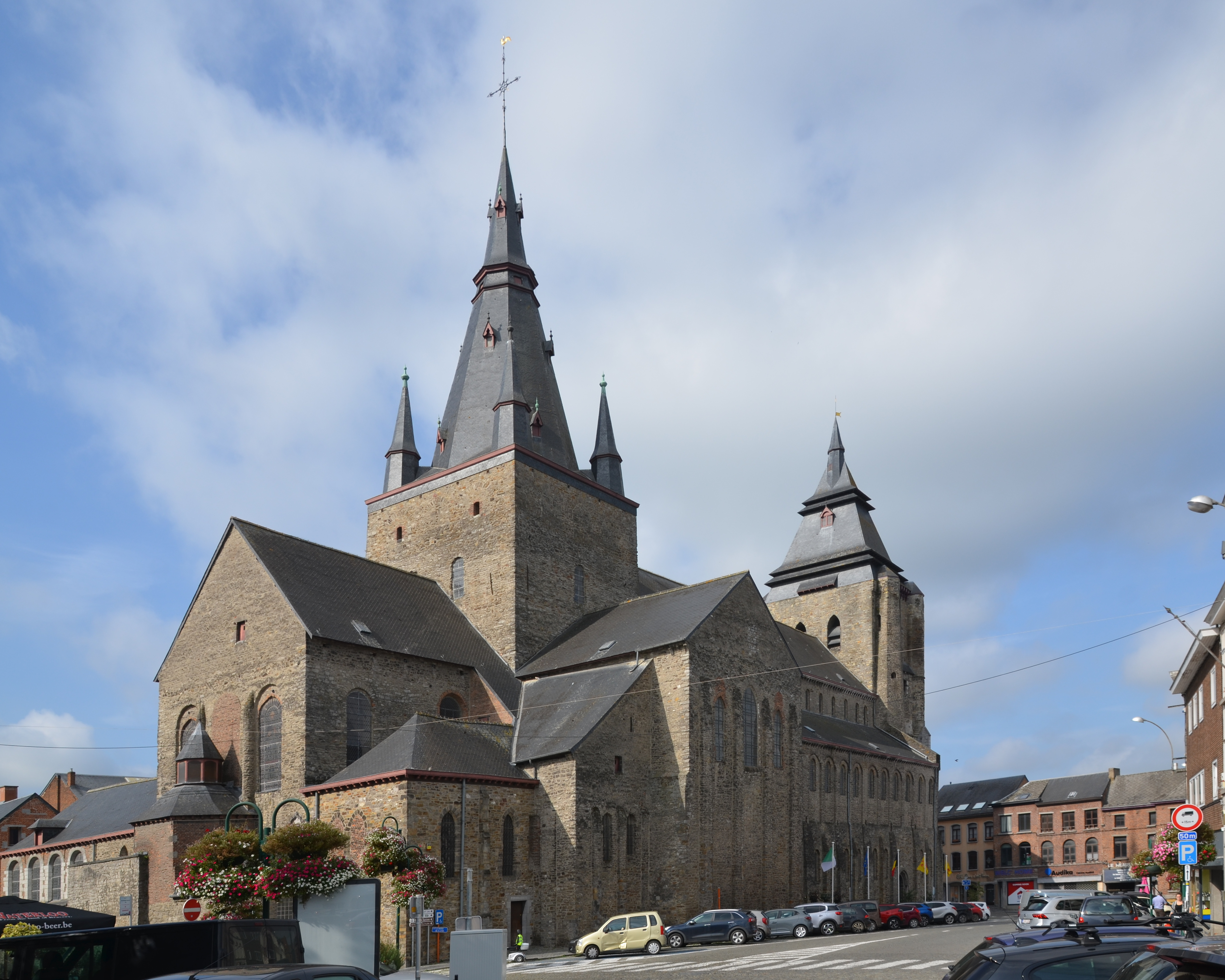
Collegiate Church of St. Vincent

The known history of the region starts in the 7th century. The Frankish merchant Samo, who founded an empire in Central Europe, may have come from Soignies (Latin: pagus Senonagus). In the 670s, Madelgaire, a wealthy former governor under King Dagobert I, and his wife Waltrude decided to separate and devote themselves to a religious life. Both of them founded an abbey, Madelgaire in Soignies and Waltrude in neighbouring Mons. Madelgaire took the religious name of Vincent. Like his wife, he was canonized after his death and later became the patron saint of the city that would eventually grow around the monastery. At that time, a large forest covered the whole area, the remnants of which near Brussels are still called the Sonian Forest (French: Forêt de Soignes, Dutch: Zoniënwoud) today. The existence of the abbey of Soignies is mentioned for the first time in the Treaty of Meersen, dated August 8, 870, as one of King Charles the Bald's possessions.

=== The age of the canons ===
At the end of the 9th century, a general decline in religious life led to a chapter of powerful canons – who did not take any vow of poverty – taking the place of the monks. These canons would remain in power for eight centuries, until the French Revolution. By the 10th century, the canons started the construction of the Church of St. Vincent (Madelgaire), which was to be completed during the following century in the prevalent Romanesque style of the period. The first known charter by Baldwin IV, Count of Hainaut was granted to Soignies in 1142. The fame of the Church of St. Vincent grew in the 13th century, when the bishop of Cambrai granted a 40-day indulgence to every visitor to the church. The settlement grew to urban proportions at around the same time, coinciding with the development of the textile industry and the building of a defensive wall. The first stone quarries mentioned in the archives date from around 1400, but several clues suggest that local stone was already quarried much earlier. The cut-stone industry, however, started only around 1700.

=== 1789–present ===
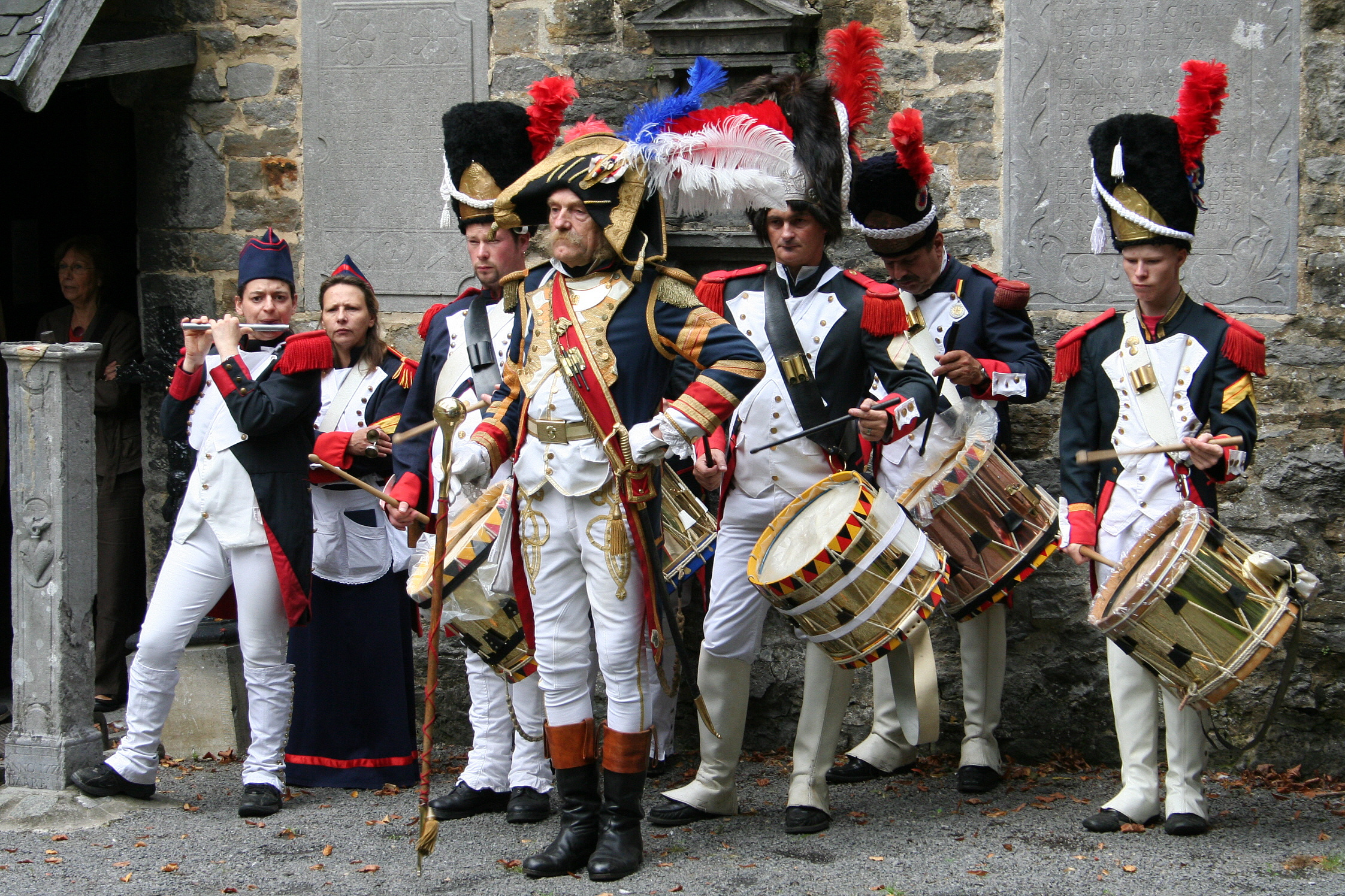
Folk group "The Grenadiers of the Imperial Guard"

On 1 September 1796, the revolutionary council disbanded the local administration by the canons, dealing a heavy blow to the local economy. In 1812, only 92 people worked in the quarries on a total population of about 4,000 people. The industry rebounded under the Dutch regime, and even more after the Belgian Revolution of 1830.

Between 1831 and 1995, Soignies elected its own member of the Chamber of Representatives. Several of the city streets are named after these past representatives.

Today, the cut-stone and glass industries are still active. Soignies is also the center of a vibrant service industry, especially in education and health.

== Sights ==
- The Collegiate Church of St. Vincent is one of the earliest specimens of Romanesque churches in Belgium. The choir dates from the beginning of the 11th century while the Gothic west tower dates from around 1250. The cemetery still has tombs of the 13th and 14th century.
- Near the church stands the Cloth Market (in French Halle aux Draps), dating from the 16th century.

== Festivities ==
- The origins of the Processio of Saint Vincent (Madelgaire) are not well known. It is certain, however, that it already took place as early as the 13th century. Today, every Monday of Pentecost, the reliquary of Saint Vincent is carried in a historic procession along a predetermined 11-km-long circuit around town, known as the Grand Tour Saint Vincent.
- The Saturday preceding the third Sunday of October is the date of the local carnival. The festivities are known as La Simpélourd – from the contraction of two French words meaning simple and heavy – after a cuckold who lived in Soignies more than 200 years ago. This character still takes central stage in the colourful celebration.

== Sport ==
Soignies is home to Rugby Union club RC Soignies, winners of the Belgian Cup in 2010.

== People born in Soignies ==
- Samo, Frankish merchant and later king (rex) of the 7th-century Slavic state known as Samo's Empire (Soignies is one of two presumed birthplaces, the other being Sens)
- Guillaume Malbecque, Flemish composer (c. 1400–1465)
- François de Cuvilliés, Rococo architect (1695–1768)
- Jules Bordet, immunologist and microbiologist (1870–1961)
- Paul van Zeeland, lawyer, economist, and politician (1893–1973)
- Johan Walem, football player and TV consultant (born 1972)
- Chris Richardson, American singer-songwriter (born 1984)
