= Haine =

River in Belgium and France

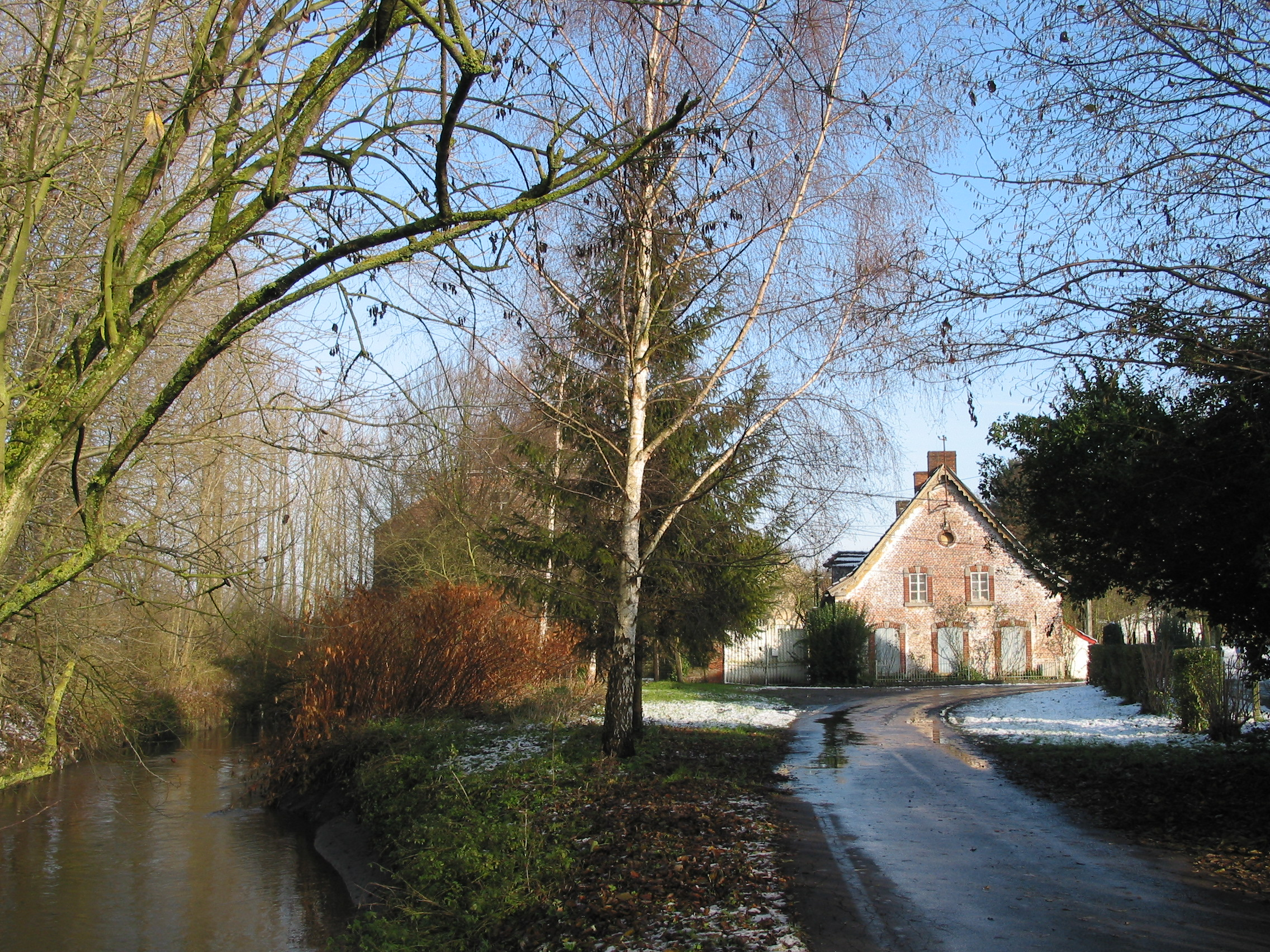
- The Haine river in Havré

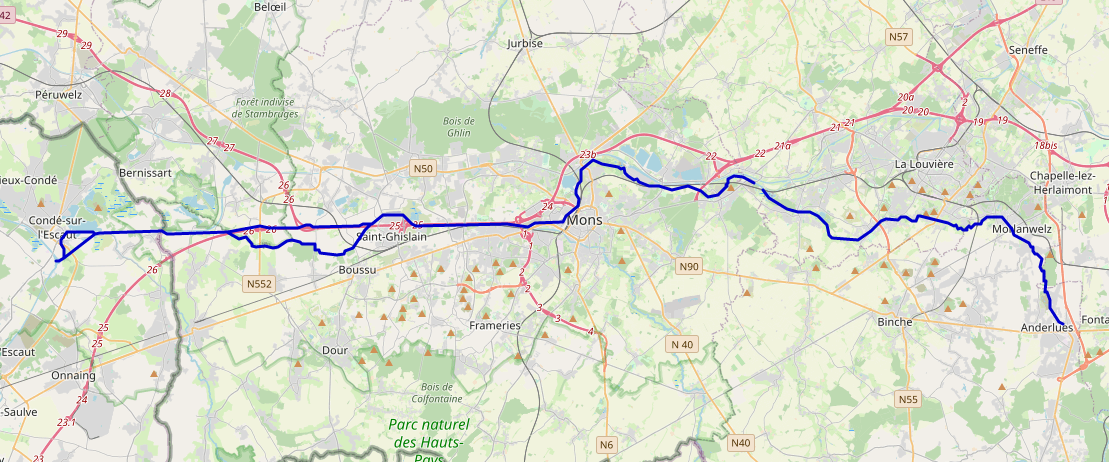

Location
- Countries: Belgium and France

Physical characteristics
- Source
  - location: Hainaut, Belgium
- Mouth
  - location: Scheldt
  - coordinates: 50°26′17″N 3°35′39″E
- Length: ca. 78 km (48 mi)

Basin features
- Progression: Scheldt→ North Sea

The Haine (French: Haine [ɛn]; Dutch: Hene [ɦeːnə]; German: Henne; Picard: Héne; Walloon: Hinne) is a river in southern Belgium (Hainaut) and northern France (Nord), right tributary of the river Scheldt. The Haine gave its name to the County of Hainaut, and the present province of Hainaut. Its source is in Anderlues, Belgium. As the western end of the sillon industriel, Wallonia's industrial backbone, it flows through the heavily industrialized Borinage region, notably the towns La Louvière, Mons and Saint-Ghislain. A few kilometres after crossing the border into France, the Haine flows into the Scheldt in Condé-sur-l'Escaut. Its length within Belgium is 72 km (45 mi) and the Belgian part of its drainage basin is 802 km^{2} (310 sq mi).
