= Derek Gardner =

Derek Gardner may refer to:

- Derek Gardner (painter)
- Derek Gardner (designer)

== See also ==
- Derrick Gardner, American jazz trumpeter
