= Frances Macdonald (English artist) =

English painter (1914-2002)

- Born: 12 April 1914; Wallasey, Cheshire, England
- Died: 5 March 2002 (aged 87); Aberdeen, Scotland
- Education: Wallasey School of Art; Royal College of Art
- Known for: Painting, drawing

Frances Macdonald (12 April 1914 – 5 March 2002), was an English painter known for her panoramic scenes painted in Wales, the south of France and in London during World War II.

== Early life ==
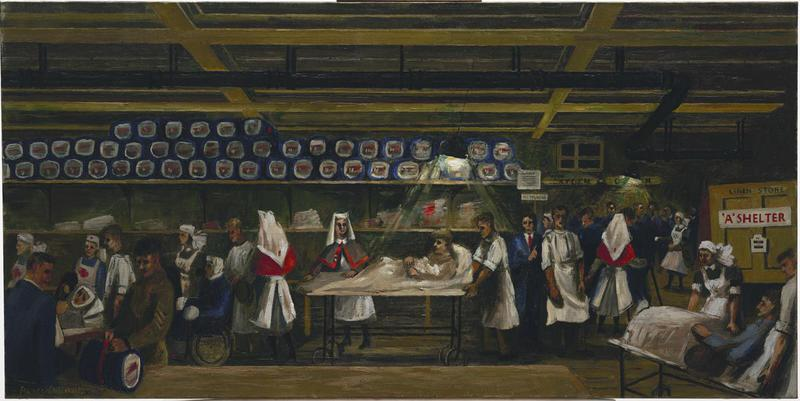
In the Millbank Hospital during an Air Raid, patients being taken to the shelter (1940) (Art.IWM ART LD 1598)

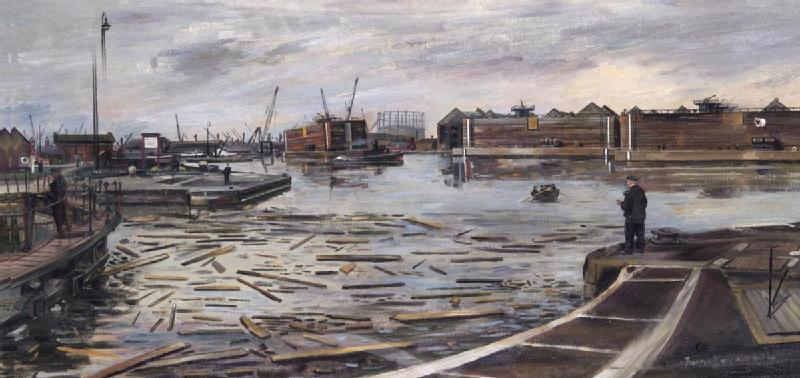
London Docks, Building Caissons for Mulberry (1944) (Art.IWM ART LD 4039)

Frances Macdonald was born in Wallasey, Cheshire, the younger of the two daughters of Francis Macdonald, a bank manager, and his wife Jessie. She trained at Wallasey School of Art between 1930 and 1934, before studying at the Royal College of Art until 1938. Whilst at the RCA Macdonald met her future husband, the artist Leonard Appelbee.

== World War II ==
At the start of the Second World War, Macdonald intended to volunteer for nursing duties but was surprised to receive a war artist commission, given how recently she had been a student. Throughout the War Macdonald received a number of short-term contracts and commissions for individual pictures from the War Artists' Advisory Committee (WAAC), and the Recording Britain project that kept her employed as an artist throughout the conflict. Macdonalds commissions included both nursing scenes, which WAAC often allocated to women artists, and heavy industrial production and repair work. The first picture Macdonald submitted to WAAC, showing people in a shelter at Queen Alexandra Military Hospital at Millbank during an air raid was deemed unacceptable due to the evident fear and apprehension portrayed. A second hospital painting was accepted in January 1941 and a new depiction of the Millbank air raid was accepted in November 1941. When the QAM Hospital was evacuated to Oxford, Macdonald followed and was permitted to paint at the nearby aircraft dump at Cowley. This resulted in three paintings, one of which was declined by WAAC. During the war, other paintings by Macdonald were accepted by the Committee but were then prohibited from going on public display by wartime censorship, if for example they showed structures built after 1939. In September 1941, she returned to London to paint a cityscape showing St Paul's Cathedral. A painting by Macdonald of the cathedral surrounded by bombed streets was shown in America during the war but was lost when the ship returning it to Britain was torpedoed and sunk. Later commissions included the London Docks, aircraft repair shops and Bailey bridges plus a portrait of their inventor Donald Bailey. In all, nineteen works by Macdonald were acquired by WAAC, including Building the Mulberry Harbour, London Docks (1944) which was requested by the Tate for its permanent collection at the end of the war. The Imperial War Museum also has a number of works by Macdonald.

== Later life ==
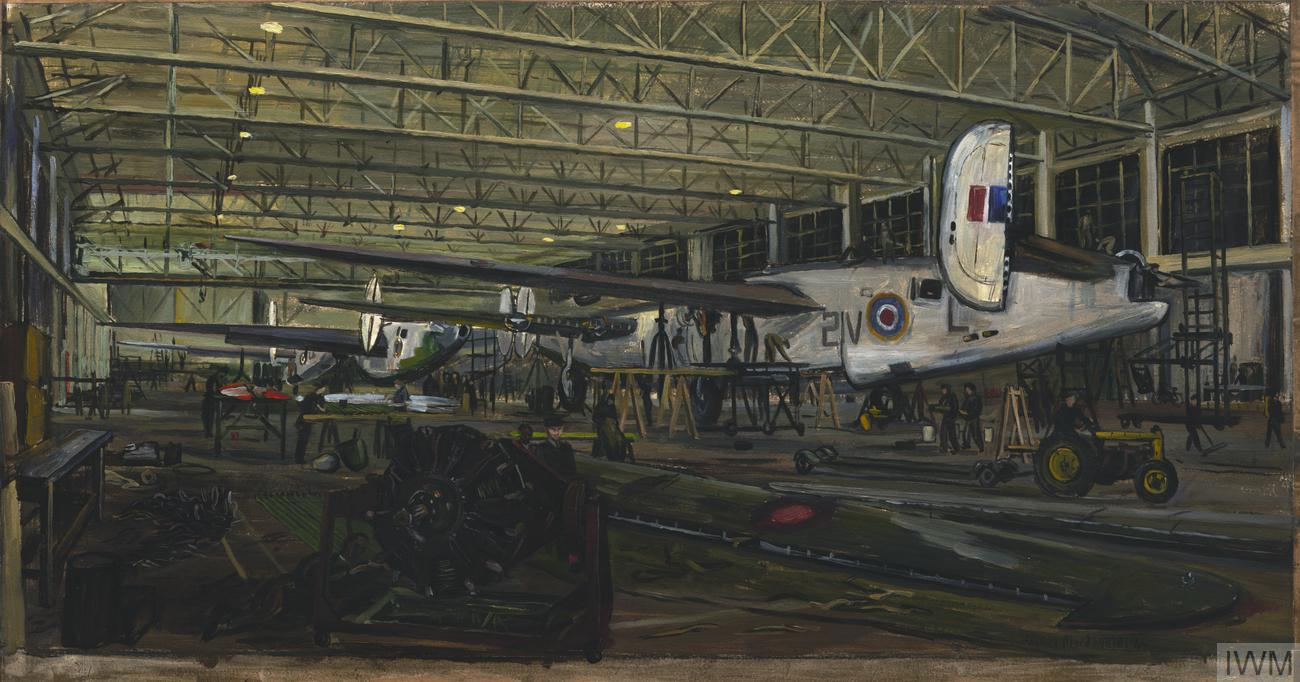
43 Repair Group Air Frame Repair Services, Lincoln, repairing Liberator aircraft (1945) (Art.IWM ART LD 5509)

After the war, Macdonald had her first solo exhibition at the Wildenstein Gallery in 1947. She produced watercolours for Londoner's England in 1947, wrote an illustrated essay for Flowers of Cities in 1949, and made drawings of the South Bank for the London County Council prior to the Festival of Britain. In 1951, the Arts Council commissioned a large landscape painting from Macdonald for the exhibition 60 Paintings for '51, which was part of the Festival of Britain celebrations in London. Macdonald produced a painting of Penrhyn Quarry, entitled The Welsh Singer, whilst Leonard Appelbee contributed the painting One-man Band to the same exhibition. Macdonald taught at Goldsmiths College of Art between 1946 and 1948, took a weekly still life class at Beckenham from 1957 until 1969 and also taught at both the Byan Shaw School and the Ruskin School of Drawing. As well as teaching art, Macdonald also exhibited at the Alfred Brod Gallery in 1961. In 1989 Francis and Leonard moved from the West Country to Kincardine-on-Forth and then to Aberdeen, to be near their only daughter, Jane. Leonard died in 2000, two years before Francis.
