= Ilija Monte Radlovic =

British Army officer, author and businessman

Ilija (Elijah) Monte Radlovic
- Born: 5 July 1914; Montenegro
- Died: 26 August 2000 (aged 86)
- Military career
- Allegiance: Britain
- Branch: Army
- Rank: Officer

Ilija (Elijah) Monte Radlovic (5 July 1914 – 26 August 2000) was a British Army officer, an author, and businessman.

== Personal background ==
Radlovic was born in the country of Montenegro. After studying at Cambridge University in England, he embarked on a career in journalism. He eventually worked for the Reuters News Agency in London after World War II. Previous jobs included the Daily Mail, and on the staff of the Balkan Herald. After further publishing endeavors he went back to study law in Belgrade.

== Military career ==
In a daring and internationally reported event, Radlovic helped organize a group of fellow fugitives from the Naval Base at Kotor after the German carpet bombing of the capital of Belgrade. They fled for freedom on board the British built Hrabri-class submarine named Nebojša (Fearless) during the German bombing invasion of April, 1941. After a treacherous journey, endangered by Axis bombing (at one point his family heard radio reports that the submarine was missing and believed sunk), he arrived in Alexandria, Egypt. He eventually enlisted in the British Army.

Serving with the famous "Desert Rats", commanded by General Bernard Montgomery, Radlovic participated in many battles (such as Tobruk, El Alamein and Monte Cassino) throughout North Africa and Italy. He rose to the rank of major as a sharpshooter in the King's Royal Rifle Corps. He was recognized as the first Allied officer to enter via tank into Bologna and Padua in Italy. He was highly decorated by the British government and awarded the Order of the British Empire by King George VI for his efforts behind enemy lines.

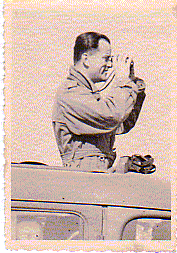
Click to Enlarge

== Literary activities ==
Radlovic spent time as a correspondent for Reuters offices in London, Rome and Belgrade. At times he was accused of being a Western Agent.

While working in the London office of Reuters he worked with the famed British journalist and TV host Derek Jameson. In his autobiography, Touched by Angels, Jameson writes that in the group of journalists in the office, "Foremost among this group was a Yugoslav war hero name Monte Radlovic, six-foot tall and good-looking with it." He said Radlovic, after the North African and Italian campaigns, "was among troops who linked up with Tito's forces on the liberation of his homeland" of Yugoslavia. Later Radlovic's positions against Yugoslav president Josip Broz Tito and communism became well known at the Reuters office. After Reuters he then founded the influential publication European Affairs where he worked closely with Bertrand Russell and George Bernard Shaw.

He came to the US in 1950, where he busied himself with literary activities. Living in Washington D.C. Radlovic started a magazine, The Diplomat. He authored two books, Tito's Republic (eventually translated into seven languages), and Etiquette and Protocol. Furthermore, he worked as Director of an anti-communist organization, the British Institute for Political Research. He enjoyed a great friendship with the architect Frank Lloyd Wright, whose wife was from his home country of Montenegro.

== Family ==
In the late 1950s, Radlovic went back to Yugoslavia to recommence legal studies at the University of Belgrade, where, in 1959, he met another student, Milena Djukic, who became his wife. Before the birth of his first son, Radlovic was again compelled to flee Yugoslavia after Communist officials threatened to jail him for his anti-communist activities.

He moved to Covina, California where he was soon joined by his wife and son. By the early 1960s, he had built a thriving real estate business, and decided to move to Claremont, California. It was there that a daughter and second son were born.

== Business ventures ==
In the years that followed, Radlovic became involved in a number of flourishing business ventures. He founded Pomona Realty Co., which grew to encompass 16 offices, and United Business Brokers, both located in the Inland Empire of Southern California. The company offered free seminars for entrepreneurs on how to develop successful businesses. Observers estimated that United Business Brokers played in a role in the creation of more than 150 businesses in the Inland Empire. For years he was the owner of the well-known restaurant Magic Towers, located at 540 E.Foothill Boulevard (Route 66) in Pomona, California.

In his later years, even after he became seriously ill, he worked on a project to build a World Trade Center near the Ontario International Airport, which never reached fruition.

== Memberships and organisations ==
He was active in a number of organizations, principally as a Master Mason of the Claremont Masonic Lodge, as a member of the Almalikah Shrine and Pasadena Scottish Rite in Los Angeles, and of the Claremont University Club.

== Death ==
Radlovic died at age 86. He left behind his wife Milena, of Claremont, sons Mike Radlovic of Diamond Bar, CA, Marko Radlovic and wife, Julie, with 3 granddaughters of Sherman Oaks, CA (Samantha, Sydney, Sophia), daughter Alexandra Radlovic of Paris, France, and two children from a previous marriage, Sally and Adrienne.

Longtime friends California State Senator Jim Brulte of Rancho Cucamonga and L.A. County Supervisor Mike Antonovich led their respective elected bodies in adjourning in Monte Radlovic's memory upon the day of his death in August 2000.

A close friend, Nicholas Polos, described Radlovic as "a warm and friendly person," with "European manners," and as "an elegant gentleman and scholar." Congressman David Dreier said of him, "Monte Radlovic epitomized the American Dream. He was an immigrant who came to the United States and did extraordinarily well. I had the privilege of knowing him for 20 years, and was very, very saddened by his passing."

== Sources ==
1. Autobiography "Touched by Angels," by Derek Jameson
2. Editor of the diplomat
3. Monte Radlovic, I. (1948). Tito's Republic.
4. Monte Radlovic, I. (1957). Etiquette & Protocol: A Handbook of Conduct in American and International Circles. ASIN B0006AUW3O.
5. Congressman David Dreier
6. Langmead, Donald (2003). Frank Lloyd Wright: A Bio-bibliography. Bloomsbury Academic. ISBN 9780313319938.
