= Henry Hadley (died 1914) =

First British casuality of WWI

- Born: 27 March 1863; Cheltenham, England
- Died: 5 August 1914 (aged 51); Gelsenkirchen, German Empire
- Cause of death: Gunshot wound
- Education: Cheltenham College
- Occupation: Language teacher
- Known for: Being the "first British casualty" of World War I

Henry Hadley (27 March 1863 – 5 August 1914) was an English civilian who was fatally shot in Germany, allegedly while resisting arrest, on 3 August 1914, the day before the United Kingdom's entry into the First World War. He is sometimes described as the "first British casualty" of World War I.

== Early life and family ==
Hadley was born in Cheltenham, Gloucestershire. His father, also Henry Hadley (1812–1874), had been a senior doctor in the British Army, serving as a surgeon with the 40th Foot and the Rifle Brigade, in Australia with the 11th Foot and 99th Foot, at the Castle Hospital at Balaklava in the Crimean War, before retiring in 1861 with the honorary rank of Deputy Inspector-General of Hospitals. His mother, Alpha Clementia Dunn, was from Hobart, Tasmania. His paternal grandfather, also Henry Hadley (1762–1830), was the physician of Erasmus Darwin and married Darwin's illegitimate daughter Susannah Parker (1772–1856) in 1809.

He was educated at Cheltenham College, attended the Royal Military Academy Woolwich, and served as a lieutenant in the 1st West India Regiment from 1887 to 1890. He later became a teacher of languages.

== Death ==
Hadley had been teaching in Berlin for three or four years, but decided to move to Paris following Germany's declarations of war against Russia on 1 August 1914 and then France on 3 August, and its ultimatum to Belgium, in the preceding days. At 1:25 pm local time on 3 August, Hadley and his English housekeeper, Elizabeth Pratley, caught a train to Cologne from Berlin's Friedrichstraße station, intending to change trains there.

A conductor on the train became suspicious of his behaviour, and Hadley became involved in an altercation while the train was stopped at Gelsenkirchen station. It was later claimed that Hadley had spoken in several foreign languages, did not appear to know where he was travelling to, argued with a waiter in the dining car, and made gestures at German officers. After briefly returning to his seat, he was shot in the stomach while in the train's corridor by a Prussian military officer, First Lieutenant Nicolay.

Hadley was taken by ambulance to the Evangelische Krankenhaus in Gelsenkirchen, and died there at 3:15 am local time on 5 August – just three hours after the UK declared war on Germany. He was buried in a pauper's grave in zone 11, division 9 of the Protestant cemetery at Gelsenkirchen, but the exact site of the burial is no longer known.

Elizabeth Pratley was interrogated as a potential spy, at a military prison in Münster, but was eventually released, without charge, to the Clemenshospital in Münster, and finally allowed to return home in November 1914. She then informed the British government of Hadley's death, on 26 November 1914.

== Legacy ==
The British government received a communiqué from the German government, via the then-neutral American embassy in Berlin, declaring that Lieutenant Nicolay insisted that he had acted in self-defence, saying that Hadley had appeared to be reaching for a weapon, and did not respond to the warning "hands up or I will shoot". A court martial cleared him of all blame and he was promoted to Captain within a few months of the incident. Nonetheless, the British government continued to regard the case as one of murder. They issued a statement, published in The Times on 17 April 1915, which quoted the German communiqué, and protested at the acquittal of Nicolay. A statement by Hadley's cousin S. Eardley Wilmot was published on 20 April 1915, also doubting the German official account, and cited the case as an example of "Prussian brutality". Other English periodicals made comparisons to the Saverne Affair, in which an unarmed Alsatian shoemaker was severely wounded by a Prussian officer wielding a sabre, but the officer was ultimately acquitted of any offence at court martial.

In 1917, the German authorities revealed that some of Hadley's possessions had been sold by a court-appointed administrator and the proceeds used to pay the costs of his hospital treatment. Subsequently, more of his belongings were returned to his family, via the neutral authorities in The Hague.

== See also ==
- HMS Amphion, a British scout cruiser, sunk by a German mine on 6 August 1914, with around 170 killed
- Private John Parr, reputedly the first British soldier killed in the First World War, on 21 August 1914
