= Carl Hans Lody =

German naval reserve officer; spy

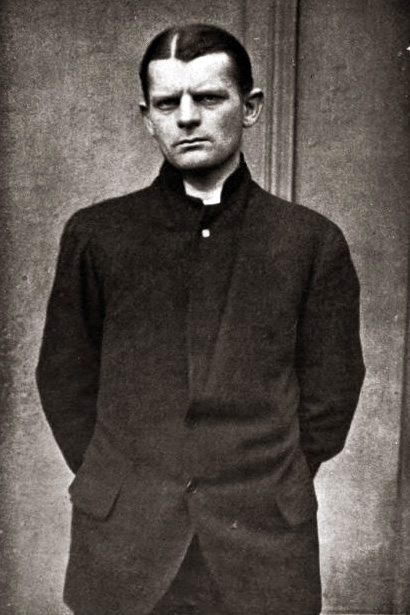
- Born: 20 January 1877; Berlin, Free State of Prussia, German Empire
- Died: 6 November 1914 (aged 37) Tower of London, London, England
- Cause of death: Execution by firing squad
- Allegiance: German Empire
- Branch: Imperial German Navy
- Service years: 1900–01, 1914
- Rank: Oberleutnant zur See (Note: Equivalent to Sub-Lieutenant (UK) or Lieutenant Junior Grade (US).)
- Awards: Iron Cross, Second Class (posthumous)

Carl Hans Lody, alias Charles A. Inglis (20 January 1877 – 6 November 1914; name occasionally given as Karl Hans Lody), was a reserve officer of the Imperial German Navy who spied in the United Kingdom in the first few months of the First World War.

In May 1914, two months before the start of World War I, Lody was approached by German naval intelligence officials. He agreed to be a peacetime spy in southern France, but after war broke out, in late August he was sent to the United Kingdom with orders to spy on the Royal Navy. Lody had been given no training in espionage, and within only a few days of arriving he was detected by the British authorities. The British counter-espionage agency MI5, then known as MO5(g), allowed him to continue his activities in the hope of learning more about the German spy network. His first two messages were allowed to reach the Germans, but later messages were stopped, as they contained sensitive military information. At the start of October 1914, concern over the increasingly sensitive nature of his messages prompted MO5(g) to order his arrest.

Lody was put on public trial – the only one held for a German spy captured in the UK in either world war – before a military court in London. He was convicted and sentenced to death after a three-day hearing. Four days later, on 6 November 1914, Lody was shot at dawn by a firing squad at the Tower of London in the first execution there in 167 years.

When the Nazi Party came to power in Germany in 1933, it declared him a national hero. Lody became the subject of memorials, eulogies and commemorations in Germany before and during the Second World War. A destroyer bore his name.

== Early life and career ==
Carl Hans Lody was born in Berlin on 20 January 1877. His father was a lawyer in government service who served as mayor of Oderberg in 1881. The Lody family subsequently moved to Nordhausen, where they lived at 8 Sedanstrasse (today Rudolf-Breitscheid-Strasse). Lody's father served as deputy mayor there in 1882 but died in June 1883 after a short illness and his mother died in 1885. He was fostered for a time by a couple in Leipzig before entering the orphanage of the Francke Foundations in nearby Halle.

Lody began an apprenticeship at a grocery store in Halle in 1891, before moving to Hamburg two years later to join the crew of the sailing ship Sirius as a cabin boy. He studied at the maritime academy in Geestemünde, qualifying as a helmsman, and immediately afterwards served with the Imperial German Navy for a year between 1900 and 1901. Subsequently joining the First Naval Reserve, he enlisted as an officer on German merchant ships. In 1904 he returned to Geestemünde, where he successfully obtained a captain's licence. He fell seriously ill with what he later said was a stomach abscess, "caused from a very badly cured typhoid attack of fever from which I suffered in Italy on account of the bad water at Genoa." An operation was required, which weakened his left arm and his eyesight. As Lody put it, "Consequently, my career as a seaman was closed as soon as I discovered that, and my doctor told me that I could not go any further."

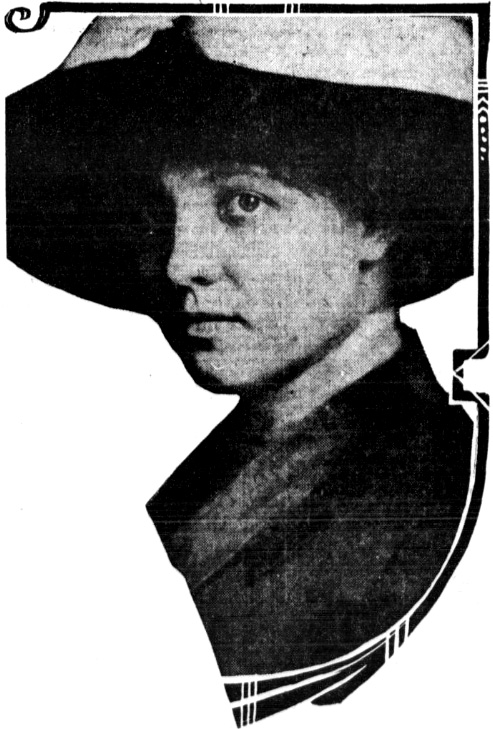
Louise Storz, Lody's wife from October 1912 to March 1914

Lody found alternative employment with the Hamburg America Line, which had inaugurated a personally guided tour service for wealthy travellers going from Europe to America. Lody became a tour guide responsible for looking after these clients, and in this capacity visited European countries, including Britain. During one such tour he met a German-American woman named Louise Storz, the 23-year-old adoptive daughter of a wealthy beer brewer, Gottlieb Storz of Omaha, Nebraska. Louise's tour included several European countries, including Germany; by its conclusion she and Lody were engaged. After visiting Lody's family in Berlin, the couple travelled to the United States. They were married on 29 October 1912 in what the Omaha Daily Bee described as "a 'society' wedding":

The home was beautifully decorated with chrysanthemums, palms and ferns. The ceremony and the details that preceded it were elaborate. About seventy-five guests attended. After an extended western honeymoon tour Mr. and Mrs. Lody established a residence at the Clarinda.

Despite the high profile of the wedding the couple lived together for only two months. Lody sought to obtain a position in the Storz Brewing Company but he lacked expertise in brewing. As the local Omaha Daily Bee newspaper put it, "Here he was in the United States with a wife to support and no position in sight." He found a job working as a clerk for the Union Pacific Railroad for under $100 a month. Two months after they were married, Louise brought suit for divorce, charging that Lody had "beat[en] her, inflicting serious wounds to her body." Lody left for Berlin shortly thereafter; over six months later, he unexpectedly returned with a German lawyer to contest the suit in the Douglas County courts. The suit was withdrawn without explanation a few days later; Lody returned to Berlin. The two sides apparently reached an amicable settlement; in February 1914 the divorce suit was reinstated and Lody agreed not to contest it. The divorce was granted the following month.

The military historian Thomas Boghardt suggests that the Storz family did not approve of the match, and may have pressured the couple to separate. Lody said later that his former father-in-law gave him $10,000, possibly as compensation. The failed marriage had a lasting effect on Lody. He wrote in 1914: "My feelings run riot when I can permit myself to review the dramatic events of the last three years and what is to be the probable climax of it all."

== Beginning of espionage career ==
On his return to Germany, Lody settled in Berlin, living in what he described as "well to do circumstances". He stayed in the Adlon, the city's most fashionable luxury hotel, while his sister Hanna lived with her doctor husband in the prosperous suburb of Westend in Charlottenburg. As tensions grew across Europe in the first half of 1914, German naval intelligence – the Nachrichten-Abteilung, or "N" – set out to recruit potential agents. Lody already had links with the service. During his time with the Imperial German Navy, Lody had served under Arthur Tapken, who later became N's first director. The German Imperial Admiralty Staff, or Admiralstab, listed Lody as a possible recruitment target before the outbreak of war. The naval authorities regarded Hamburg America Line (HAL) employees such as Lody as ideal recruits because of their expertise in naval matters and presence in ports worldwide. The HAL had collaborated with the Admiralstab since the 1890s. The relationship became so close that in July 1914, just before the outbreak of the war, the HAL's director Albert Ballin told the Admiralstab that he would "place myself and the organisation subordinate to me at your Excellency's disposal as best as possible."

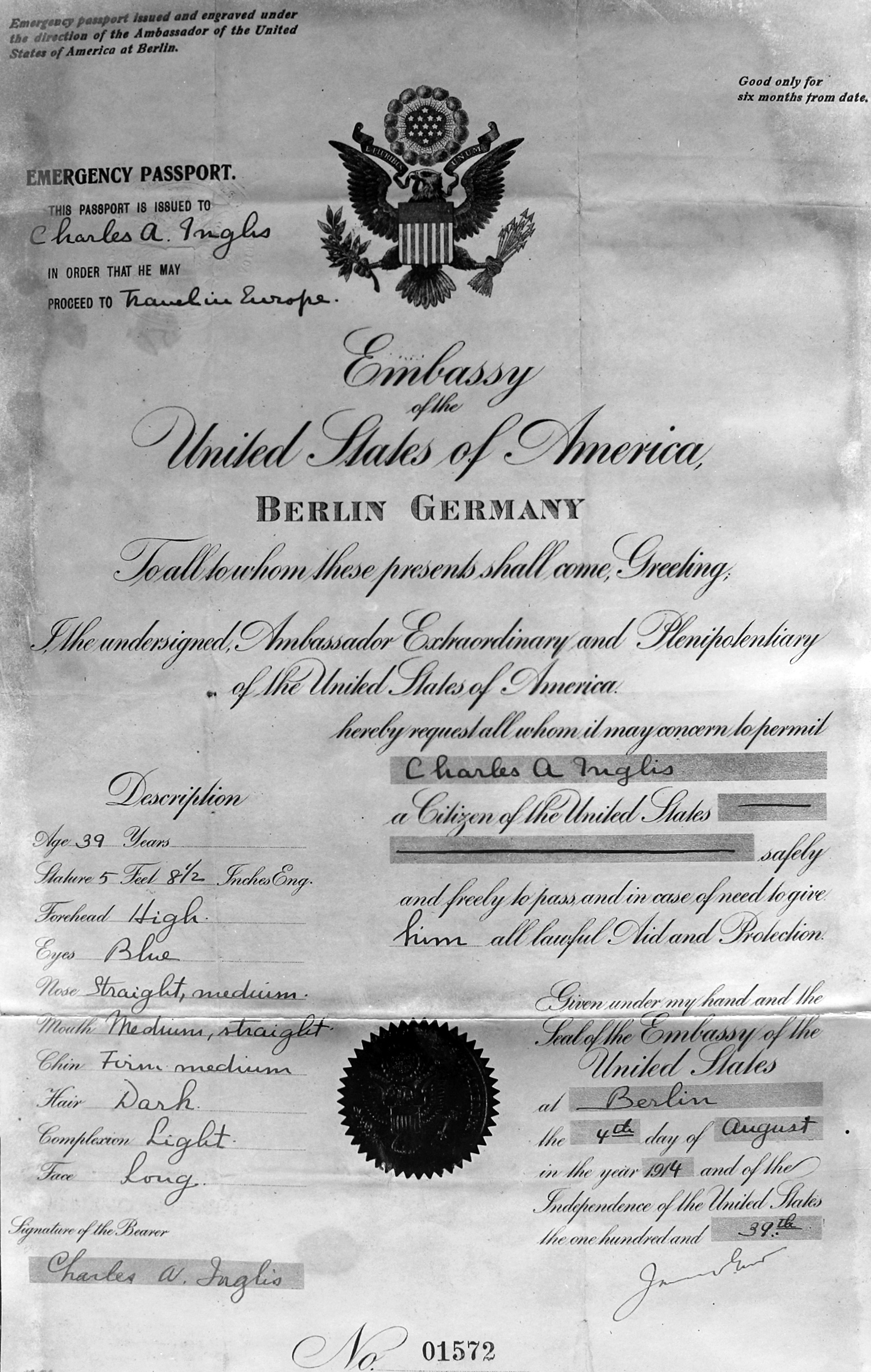
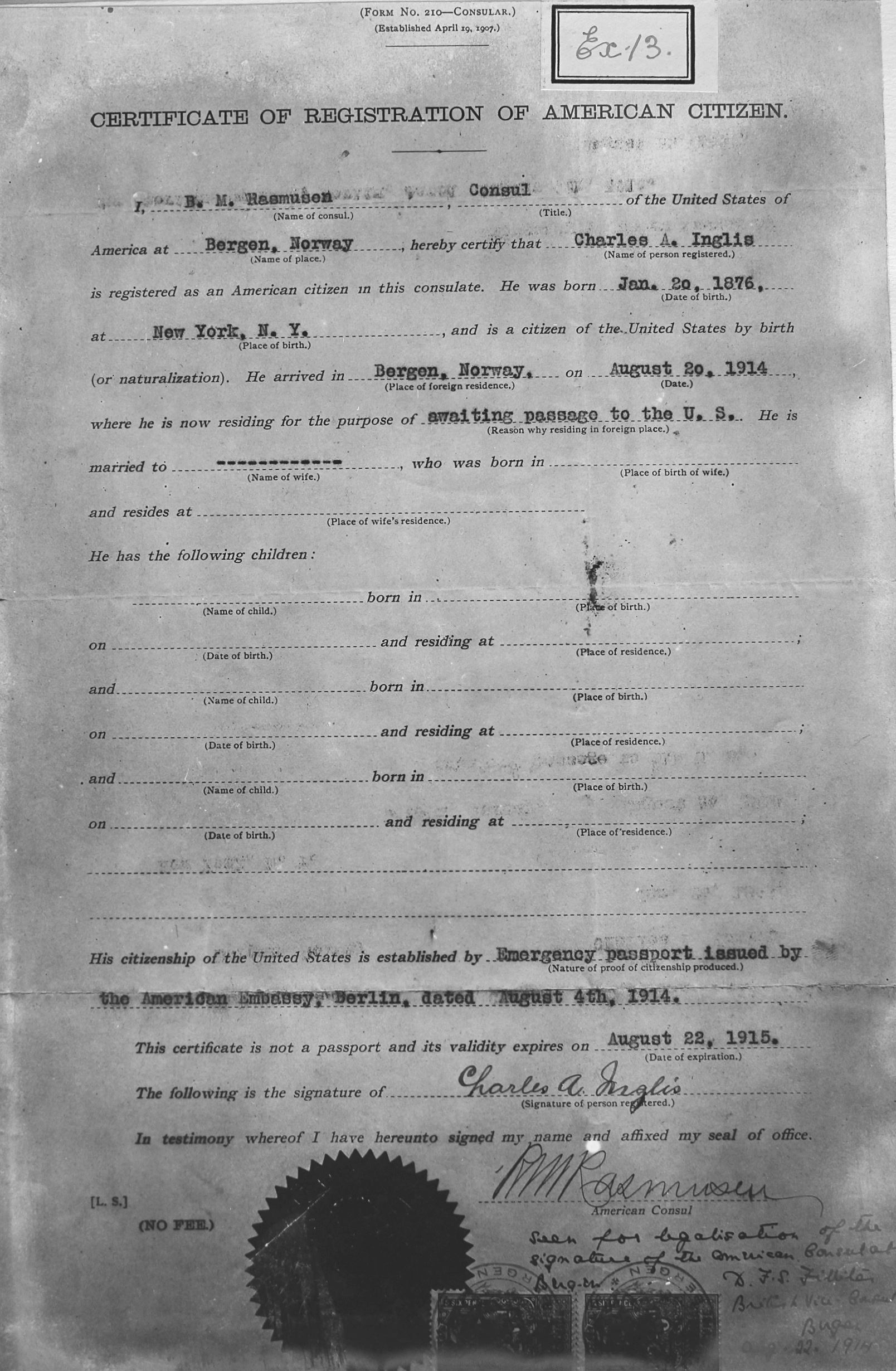
Lody's American documents, in the name of Charles A. Inglis: the real Inglis's passport (left), acquired for Lody by the German Foreign Office, and a supporting certificate of registration (right), procured by Lody in Bergen, Norway

On 8 May 1914, Fritz Prieger, the director of N, contacted Lody to ask whether he was willing to serve as a naval agent. Lody replied that he was "honoured" by Prieger's trust and would serve at Prieger's disposal. Within three weeks Lody had signed a formal agreement to operate as a "tension traveller" in southern France – an agent who would report back to Berlin in times of heightened international tensions. The assassination of Archduke Franz Ferdinand of Austria on 28 June and the subsequent July Crisis precipitated the outbreak of World War I on 28 July.

With the United Kingdom declaring war in support of France and Belgium, Prieger sent Lody to Britain as a war agent. Lody was ordered to base himself in the Edinburgh–Leith area and monitor British naval movements. He was to travel along the Scottish coast and report on the warships stationed there; "If or when Mr. Lody comes to know that a naval battle has taken place, he will enquire as much and unobtrusively as possible regarding losses, damage etc." His orders reflected the Admiralstab's belief that the war would be decided by a single major naval battle.

To communicate with his handlers, Lody was instructed to write to certain addresses in Christiania (now Oslo), Stockholm, New York City and Rome. He acquired an American emergency passport in the name of Charles A. Inglis, a genuine document obtained from the US Embassy in Berlin. When Germany declared war on Russia on 1 August, newly imposed restrictions prevented foreigners from leaving Germany without travel documents. Embassies and consulates throughout the country experienced a rush of visitors as foreigners sought emergency passports; these had to be submitted to the German Foreign Ministry to obtain exit permits for neutral Denmark or the Netherlands. One such applicant was the real Charles A. Inglis, whose passport went missing – lost, it was claimed, although in fact the Foreign Ministry had appropriated it for Lody's use. As the passport lacked security features such as the holder's photograph or fingerprints, being merely a single-sheet document, it was well-suited for use by a spy. Lody said later that he had received it in the post from his superiors at N. He was also given £250 in British banknotes, 1,000 Danish krone and 1,000 Norwegian krone to finance his mission to the UK, where he would travel via Denmark and Norway.

Gustav Steinhauer, the head of N's British section, later wrote that he had met Lody shortly before the latter's departure, and spoken with him on a couple of occasions. Steinhauer had been active in Britain shortly before the outbreak of war, and was keen to give Lody advice on the difficulties he would face:

When you are in England, Lody, you are not in Germany or France with a neutral frontier close at hand to assist your escape. You will have to get through a port, and it will not be easy ... It will mean death if you are in the slightest degree careless. You must remember that all foreigners will be watched everywhere. Your correspondence will be opened and your luggage will be ransacked. They will go over your passport with a microscope to see that it is not forged and they will make you notify every change of address that you have.

To Steinhauer's apparent surprise, Lody appeared nonchalant about the danger that he was about to go into. "Well, after all, one might as well die that way as any other," Lody said, according to Steinhauer; "I shall be rendering the Fatherland a service and no other German can do more than that." At a final meeting at the Anhalter Bahnhof in Berlin, Steinhauer repeated his warnings, but Lody "only laughed at me and told me my fears were groundless." Steinhauer regarded Lody's ability to carry out his mission as "practically nil" and warned the Chief of Naval Intelligence not to send him to the UK, but the warning went unheeded. He recalled that "as he had specially volunteered for the task – and I must admit there were very few people in Berlin just then anxious to accompany him – they allowed him to go."

As Steinhauer noted in his autobiography, the UK was a dangerous environment for a foreign agent. Only five years previously, the country had not had a dedicated counter-espionage organisation. In 1909 a series of spy scares fanned by the press led to the establishment of the Secret Service Bureau, jointly headed by Captain Vernon Kell and Lieutenant-Commander Mansfield Cumming. They soon split their responsibilities; Kell took charge of counter-espionage, while Cumming focused on foreign intelligence. These two divisions of the Secret Service Bureau eventually became two independent intelligence agencies, MI5 and MI6. The bureau quickly identified a list of possible German agents in the UK. Just before the outbreak of war on 4 August 1914, chief constables across Britain and Ireland were instructed to arrest suspects in their areas. This was done quickly and a number of German agents were caught, crippling German intelligence operations in the UK at a crucial moment in the war. Steinhauer himself had been lucky to escape arrest; he was known by name to the British authorities and he had been spying on the Royal Navy in Scotland as recently as late June 1914.

== Scotland ==
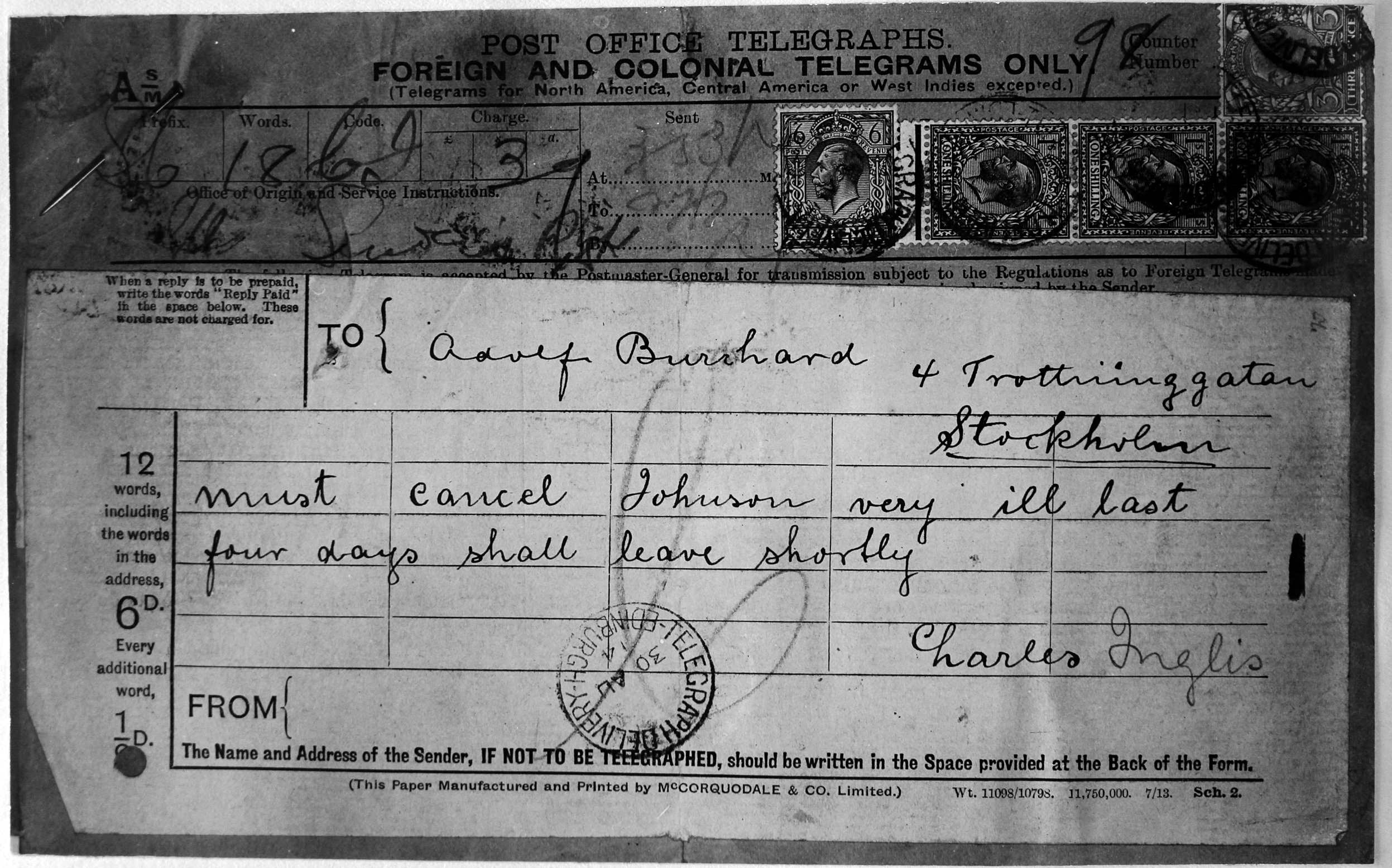
Lody's telegraph to "Adolf Burchard" in Sweden, which revealed his assumed identity to the British authorities

Lody embarked on his mission "so hastily that he did not even have time to learn a code that might have assisted him to get his messages through", according to Steinhauer. Posing as an American tourist, Lody left Berlin on 14 August, travelling via Denmark to the Norwegian port of Bergen. There he boarded a ship that took him to Newcastle, arriving on the evening of 27 August. He took a train to the North British Hotel (now the Balmoral Hotel) adjacent to Edinburgh Waverley railway station. On 30 August, he sent a telegram from Edinburgh's main post office to an Adolf Burchard at 4 Drottninggatan, Stockholm – a cover address for a German agent in Sweden. The message said: "Must cancel Johnson very ill last four days shall leave shortly" and was signed "Charles". As it was an overseas telegram, he had to sign for it with his full (alias) name.

The Secret Service Bureau's counter-espionage section had by now become part of the War Office's Directorate of Military Operations and was known as MO5(g). At the outbreak of war it instituted widespread censorship of letters and telegrams sent abroad. From 4 August all mails from the UK to Norway and Sweden had been brought to London for examination to identify any being sent to suspect addresses. Fatally for Lody, MO5(g) was already aware that the Stockholm address was that of a German agent, and was watching for correspondence using the "Johnson" formula employed in Lody's telegram. "Burchard" was later identified as a German agent by the name of K. Leipziger. After Lody sent his telegram to "Burchard", exposing his "Charles Inglis" alias on the telegram form, MO5(g)'s Letter Interception Unit conducted a back-tracking exercise to find any other messages sent to the same place. One of MO5(g)'s censors later described the scene at Salisbury House in London, where the Letter Interception Unit was based:

Several names were written on a large blackboard which hung on the wall, plainly visible, and we had to keep a sharp look-out for any mention of these in letters we read. The names were those of persons suspected of sending information to Germany via neutral countries. In addition, a short sentence was scribbled up on this board: 'Johnson is ill'. The Admiralty knew that somewhere in Britain a German officer was travelling about who intended to use this formula to convey the news of certain movements of the British fleet.

The "Johnson" telegram reached its destination and was only identified retrospectively by the British authorities. It was said to have indicated the presence of four British battleships, though the censors took its meaning to be that "he was being watched and in danger & would have to leave Edinburgh which he did later on."

Having inadvertently exposed his assumed identity, Lody's subsequent communications came under close scrutiny by MO5(g). He left his Edinburgh hotel on 1 September, and moved to a boarding-house in Drumsheugh Gardens, where he gave his name as Charles A. Inglis of New York City and paid as a weekly boarder. Three days later he sent a letter in English to the same Stockholm address, enclosing an envelope with a second letter, in German and addressed to Berlin. This was intercepted by the British authorities, opened, photographed, sealed again and sent on to Sweden. A post-war report by MI5, the successor organisation to MO5(g), explains that it was treated this way "in the hope of learning more."

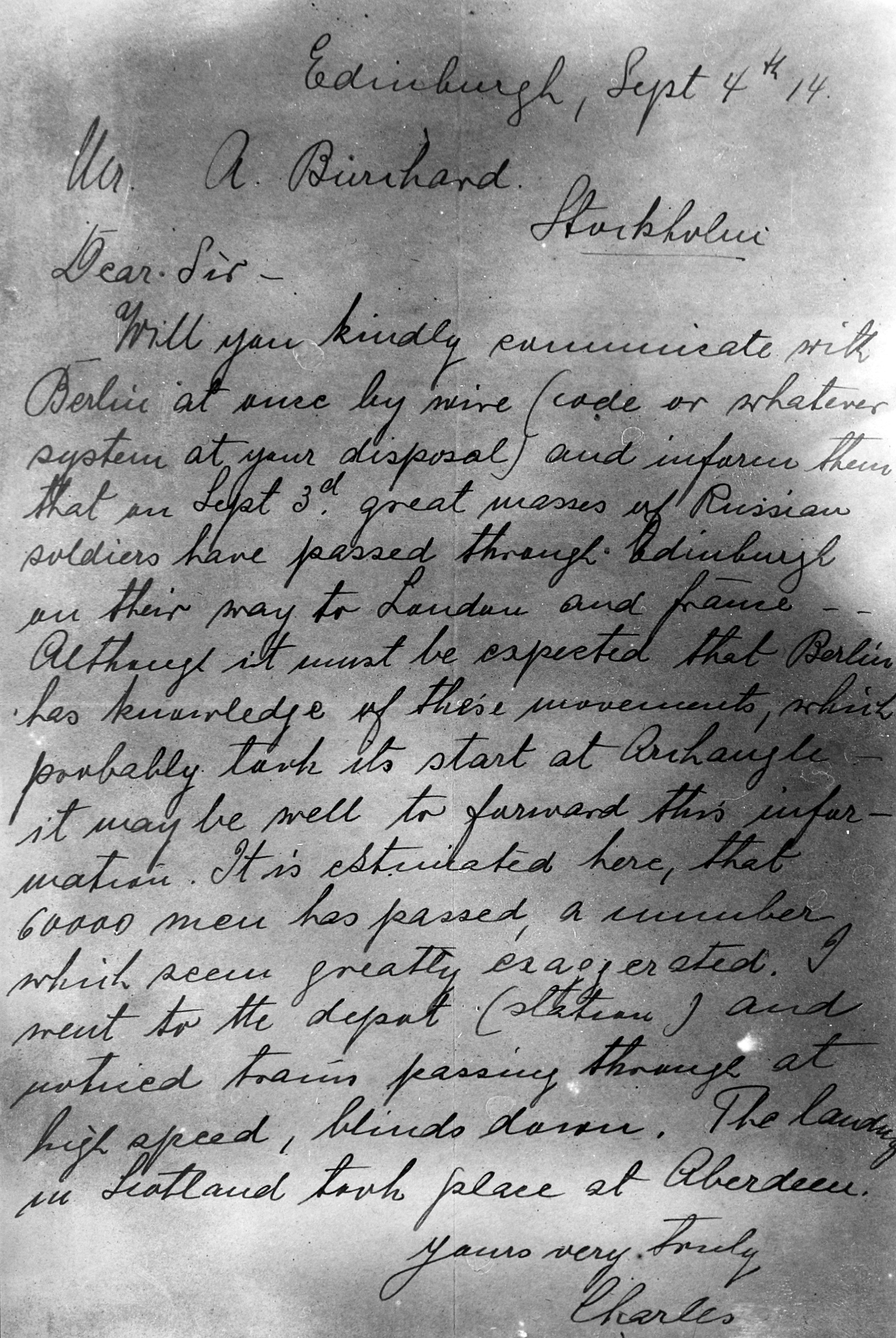
Lody's letter of 4 September 1914, reporting as true the unfounded rumour that Russian troops had landed in Scotland and were travelling south by train

In this instance MO5(g) was happy to let Lody's letters go through as they contained information that was wildly misleading and caused serious (and needless) worry to the German High Command. Lody had heard the widespread rumour that thousands of Russian troops with "snow on their boots" had passed through Scotland en route to the Western Front, and relayed it to his controllers in Berlin:

Will you kindly communicate with Berlin at once by wire (code or whatever system at your disposal) and inform them that on Sept. 3rd great masses of Russian soldiers have passed through Edinburgh on their way to London and France. Although it must be expected that Berlin has knowledge of these movements, which probably took its start at Archangel, it may be well to forward this information. It is estimated here that 60,000 men have passed, numbers which seem greatly exaggerated. I went to the depot [station] and noticed trains passing through at high speed, blinds down. The landing in Scotland took place at Aberdeen. Yours very truly Charles.

Lody's information was entirely inaccurate and had been gleaned, as he was to admit at his trial, purely from rumours: "I heard it in the boarding-house and I heard it in the barber's shop." His second letter, in German, was addressed to "Herr Stammer" at German naval intelligence in Courbierestrasse, Berlin, and contained details of British naval losses and vessels stationed at Leith and Grangemouth. He had obtained details of the naval vessels simply by climbing Calton Hill in Edinburgh and observing the panorama from the summit, and by taking a promenade along the seafront at Grangemouth, used by thousands of citizens as a popular excursion. He was worried about the risks that he was taking and stated in his letter that he would not go near any place where he could be challenged, or where barricades and restrictions prevented access. His lack of training or preparation meant that these letters, like all of his communications, were written with no attempt at concealment whatsoever – no code or invisible ink – and were composed entirely en clair in ordinary written English or German.

On 7 September, Lody went to a cycle shop at Haymarket Terrace to hire a bicycle. He told the owner's daughter that he was an American from New York who was sojourning in Edinburgh after the outbreak of war had spoiled a holiday in Europe. He was staying there for a few days while he waited for a berth to become available on a ship to America, as all the transatlantic vessels were fully booked with returnees. He said that he wanted to cycle to places around Edinburgh such as Rosyth and Queensferry and arranged to hire a bicycle. The owner's daughter warned him that some roads were now guarded and he should stop immediately if challenged by a sentry, to which he replied, "Oh, I am only going to be cycling about for pleasure!"

For the next week, Lody followed a routine of staying in his room until noon, going out for the afternoon and returning between 5 and 7 pm. He sometimes went out on his bicycle again in the evening. He spent his time looking for information and on 14 September sent a second envelope to Stockholm. This time it was merely a wrapper containing a second envelope, inside which was a letter addressed to the editor of a Berlin newspaper, Ullstein Verlag, in which Lody said:

Enclosed cutting from the Edinburgh The News of the World. Typical for the English way of causing ill-feeling and at the same time characteristic of the perfect ignorance of journalists in this country regarding the difference between military weapons and military tools. But this does not make any difference, the population here believe everything. Yours truly Nazi. (Note: The name "Nazi" was a nickname for the male name Ignatz (Ignatius). It was only later applied to members of the Nazi Party, which was founded in 1920.)

This too was intercepted and photographed but, as it was a relatively harmless letter, it was forwarded on while the British authorities continued to monitor Lody's communications in the hope of finding out more about the German espionage network. The day after sending it, on 15 September, Lody travelled to London to reconnoitre the city's war preparations. Travelling light, he stayed for two nights at the Ivanhoe Hotel in Bloomsbury (now the Bloomsbury Street Hotel) and set to work finding information about the security measures at public buildings. He said later that he had not actually observed the buildings himself but had obtained cuttings from newspapers, which he intended to send to Berlin. He also wrote a report on 16 September, but claimed that he had never sent it – it was never found by the British – as he felt that it was poorly written.

Lody returned to Edinburgh on 17 September, taking the train from King's Cross to Edinburgh. He met a young Scottish woman, Ida McClyment, gave her his card and talked with her a while before going into another carriage to smoke. There he overheard a conversation between two men, one apparently a submariner travelling to the naval base at Rosyth and the other a sailor who talked about Harwich. Lody later professed his surprise at how the two men were "talking in a rather free way, considering the present times". One of the men talked about the difficulties of serving on a submarine, while the other asked Lody: "What country are you? Are you from the other side?" Lody replied, "Yes, I am an American." They began discussing the war and talked about the recent sinking of the cruiser HMS Pathfinder, which had become the first ship ever to be sunk by a torpedo fired by a submarine. The sailor told Lody, "We are going to put out mines as the Germans have done so. We have a big surprise in store for the Germans." Lody was not convinced and, after shaking hands with the sailor, left the smoking car.

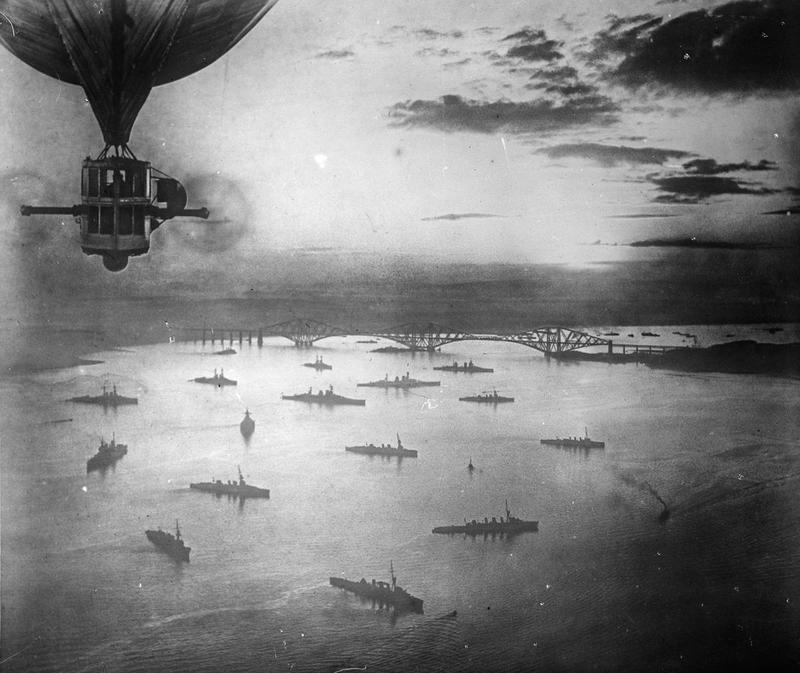
The British Guard Fleet anchored in the Firth of Forth. Lody sought to gather information on Royal Navy ships in the Firth during his stay in Edinburgh.

Lody went back to his lodgings at Drumsheugh Gardens and continued to walk and cycle around the area. He made the acquaintance of two girls he met on Princes Street and went out with them on a couple of evenings. He gave up cycling after an accident on 25 September, in which he collided with a bicycle being ridden by one of his landlady's friends while riding from Peebles to Edinburgh, causing her "some little injury". He returned his damaged bicycle to the shop where he had rented it.

On 27 September, Lody wrote another letter in German to "Burchard", enclosing press cuttings about the chivalry of British seamen and the sinking of the cruisers HMS Aboukir, Cressy and Hogue. The letter included a good deal of detailed information about naval movements and fortifications, such as the artillery defences of North Berwick, Kinghorn and North and South Queensferry. It was clear by now to Lody that his mission was not going successfully. The decisive naval battle that the German Admiralty had anticipated had not happened, and Lody was becoming increasingly fearful for his personal security. He said later:

I was in Edinburgh and I had nothing to do, and simply spent my time. I was terribly nervous. I was unaccustomed to it, and I was frightened walking about Edinburgh. I had this suit made. I was frightened to go about.

The environment in Lody's boarding-house was becoming increasingly hostile; his hosts were growing suspicious of him. Their doubts grew as the ongoing espionage scare progressed. He had stayed there for more than three weeks and his evasive answers when questioned about when he expected to leave did not satisfy them. When they said that his accent appeared to be "more German than American", he knew it was time to go. He wrote in his letter of 27 September that "the fear of espionage is very great and every day I see some Germans going to Redford Barracks under the escort of a soldier ... It is advisable for me to vanish for a few days, and to change my place of abode. I can only hope that my telegraphic and letter information have duly arrived." He told his controllers that he would go to Ireland, disembarking at Dublin as it was the only Irish port not closed to foreigners. Despite his hopes, his letter was intercepted by the British; this time it was retained as the information therein was of genuine military value.

== Journey to Ireland and capture ==
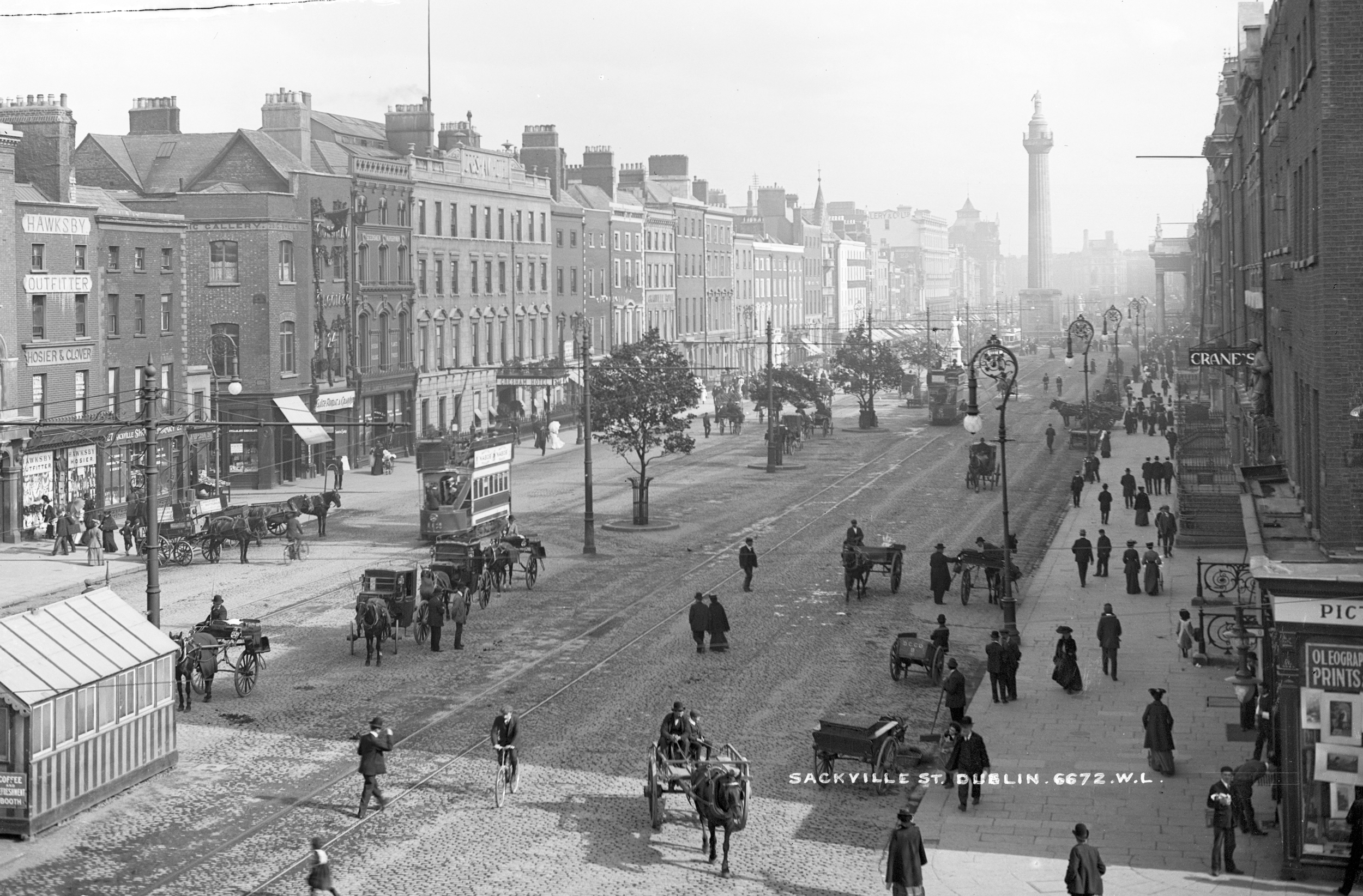
Sackville Street (now O'Connell Street), Dublin, where Lody and his companion John Lee stayed at the Gresham Hotel (in the centre left of the photograph) from 27 September to 2 October 1914

Lody left his boarding-house hastily on the morning of 27 September and stayed overnight at the Roxburgh Hotel in Edinburgh. He left some of his luggage there, telling the manageress that he would be away for about eight days, and travelled the next day to Liverpool, where he took a room at the London and North Western Hotel on Lime Street. He bought a ticket to Ireland and took the SS Munster to Dublin via Kingstown (now Dún Laoghaire). It stopped at Holyhead in Anglesey, where an immigration official challenged Lody. His American travel documents proved sufficient to demonstrate his bona fides, and he proceeded on his way.

Lody's controllers realised that his mission was not going according to plan and attempted to get in touch with him to provide assistance. A letter dated 8 September was sent to Charles A. Inglis c/o Thomas Cook, Edinburgh, but he never collected it, and may never have been aware of it. Another German agent, Paul Daelen, was ordered to go to Britain and provide Lody with a new cover address. Daelen reached England too late. Lody had already travelled to Ireland without giving his controllers a means of contacting him.

During his journey to Ireland, Lody met a Minneapolis doctor, John William Lee, who had been studying eye, ear, nose and throat diseases in Vienna before the outbreak of war had compelled him to leave. Lee was planning to travel back to New York aboard the RMS Baltic, leaving Queenstown (now Cobh) on 7 October, and intended to spend a few days exploring Ireland before his departure. Lody asked where Lee was planning to stay in Dublin; Lee told him that it would probably be the Gresham Hotel on Sackville Street, to which Lody replied, "All right, let's go there." They travelled together to the hotel, booked into separate rooms, had dinner together and went to the Empire Theatre. Lody told Lee that he had been based in Germany working for an American adding-machine company. When the conversation turned to the war, Lody opined that the German army was a very well-trained body of strong-bodied and enduring men, and that it would be hard to beat them. The following day they had breakfast together and went for a walk in Phoenix Park.

While Lee was exchanging some money at Thomas Cook on 30 September, Lody wrote a further letter in German to "Burchard", clarifying his reasons for coming to Ireland and describing what he had seen on his journey. He explained:

I think it is absolutely necessary to disappear for some time because several people have approached me in a disagreeable manner. That does not happen to me only, but several Americans here have told me that they are sharply watched. Fear of espionage is very great and one smells a spy in every stranger.

Lody described anti-Zeppelin precautions he had heard about in London and provided details of the conversions of the Cunard Line steamships RMS Aquitania and Lusitania for their wartime service, which he had seen while in Liverpool. Once again the letter was intercepted by the British and not allowed to go forward to Stockholm. Lody and Lee spent another evening in Dublin before going on a day-trip by coach to Glendalough to see the lough and the surrounding countryside. On 2 October they parted with an agreement to meet again in Killarney the following day. Lee travelled to Drogheda, where he stayed overnight, while Lody went straight to Killarney and found a room at the Great Southern Hotel (now the Malton Hotel).

Lody was unaware that his latest letters had galvanised the British authorities into action. They had hitherto been content with merely monitoring his communications but the militarily significant content of his most recent letters caused them to consider him now to be a serious threat. It did not take them long to catch up with him. His lack of even basic security precautions had left the authorities with a trail of clues that enabled them to track him down in less than a day.

While Lody was travelling to Killarney on the morning of 2 October, an Edinburgh City Police detective was ordered to enquire at hotels for a person named Inglis. The detective found that Lody had stayed at the Roxburgh Hotel and was shown his luggage, which still had a label attached bearing the name and address Charles A. Inglis, Bedford House, 12 Drumsheugh Gardens. An interview with the proprietor of the boarding-house where Lody had stayed enabled the police to reconstruct his movements, while the manageress of the Roxburgh was able to tell them that he had gone to Ireland.

The police sent a report to Lieutenant-Colonel Vernon Kell of MO5(g) on the same day to summarise their findings, and put a constant watch on the Roxburgh in case Lody returned. In the meantime, MO5(g) contacted the Irish Sea ports to find whether Lody had passed through them. Affirmative answers came back from Liverpool and Holyhead. Later that same afternoon MO5(g) sent a telegram to the Assistant Inspector General of the Royal Irish Constabulary in Dublin, which read:

Suspected German Agent believed to be passing in name of CHARLES INGLIS as American Subject travelled from Edinburgh after 26 Sept via Liverpool & Holyhead where his passport noted and name taken. Stayed last night Gresham Hotel Dublin believed moving on to Belfast. Should be arrested and all documents seized minutest search necessary probably has code with him. Important to get specimens of his handwriting if possible. Kindly wire result.

The RIC made the investigation a top priority and replied to London at 7.23 pm on 2 October:

Dr John Lea [sic] of United States arrived in Dublin on 29th with Charles Inglis and stayed at same hotel Inglis has gone to the Country today Lea will join him there tomorrow should he be arrested also description 35 years five feet eight sallow complexion darkened cropped moustache. Had a letter from Austria with him. Inspector General RIC.

At 9.45 pm, District Inspector Cheeseman of the RIC arrived at the Great Southern Hotel in Killarney with a group of constables. He found Lody's name in the visitors' book and went to his room, but did not find him there. Returning to the foyer, Cheeseman saw Lody entering the hotel. He said: "Mr. Inglis, I presume?" to which Lody replied, "Yes, what do you want?" Cheeseman asked him to come to his hotel room and noted that Lody looked upset and frightened. He arrested Lody under the provisions of the Defence of the Realm Act 1914 (DORA) as a suspected German agent, prompting Lody to exclaim, "What is this? Me, a German agent? Take care now; I am an American citizen." When he was searched, his American identity documents were found along with £14 in German gold, 705 Norwegian krone and a small notebook. The latter listed British ships that had been sunk in the North Sea, names and addresses in Hamburg and Berlin and a possible cypher key. It also included copies of the four letters that he had sent to Stockholm. His bag contained a jacket that contained a tailor's ticket reading "J. Steinberg, Berlin, C.H. Lody, 8.5.14".

Throughout all this, Lody's demeanour was relatively calm after the initial shock. Cheeseman observed that Lody only appeared uneasy when his notebook was being examined; the inspector later commented that Lody was not the usual class of man he was accustomed to dealing with, but admitted that he had never met a man under precisely similar circumstances. Cheeseman had been educated in Germany, knew the language and felt able to recognise a German accent; he noticed that Lody's American accent slipped from time to time, presumably due to stress, and became convinced that the man was German.

Lee was also arrested but was released without charge after two days when the investigation cleared him of any involvement in Lody's espionage. He complained about his treatment and the British authorities' refusal to let him see an American consul, and promised to take the matter up with the US State Department on his return. An MO5(g) officer named R.H. Price smoothed things over with him on his release on 4 October, explaining what had prompted his arrest and paying his fare back to his hotel. Price reported, "I think he was quite soothed and he shook hands with me on parting." Lee was unaware that the police had already recommended that both he and "Inglis" should be court-martialled and shot if found guilty.

== Legal complications ==
Lody was taken back to London, where he was detained in Wellington Barracks under the watch of the 3rd Battalion, the Grenadier Guards. A meeting of the Cabinet on 8 October decided to try him for "war treason", a decision that has been described as "legally, very curious" by the legal historian A. W. B. Simpson. He was not charged with espionage under either of the two relevant statutes, the Official Secrets Act 1911 or DORA. The principal reason lay in the wording of the Hague Convention of 1907, which states: "A person can only be considered a spy when, acting clandestinely or on false pretences, he obtains or endeavours to obtain information in the zone of operations of a belligerent, with the intention of communicating it to the hostile party." Lody was operating in the British Isles, outside the zone of operations, and was therefore not covered by this definition. Such circumstances had been anticipated by the most recent edition of the British Manual of Military Law, published in February 1914, which recommended that individuals in such cases should be tried for war treason: "Indeed in every case where it is doubtful whether the act consists of espionage, once the fact is established that an individual has furnished or attempted to furnish information to the enemy, no time need be wasted in examining whether the case corresponds exactly to the definition of espionage."

War treason as defined by the Manual covered a very wide range of offences, including "obtaining, supplying and carrying of information to the enemy" or attempting to do so. Its application in Lody's case, rather than the government relying on DORA, was the result of a misunderstanding by the War Office. It had been misinformed in August 1914 that an unidentified German had been captured with a radio transmitter and interned in Bodmin Prison. In fact, no such person existed, but the story led Lord Kitchener, the Secretary of State for War, to ask the Lord Chancellor, Lord Haldane, for advice on how the supposed spy should be dealt with. Haldane stated that the individual should be put before a court martial and executed if found guilty. He wrote:

If an alien belligerent is caught in this country spying or otherwise waging war he can, in my opinion, be Court Martialled and executed. The mere fact that he is resident here and has what is popularly called a domicile is not enough ... When war breaks out an alien becomes prima facie an outlaw ... if he is a spy or takes up arms ... and he becomes a person without legal rights. By international law he must have a trial before punishment but the trial may be by Court Martial. He cannot invoke the jurisdiction of the civil courts.

This theory was relied upon by the Cabinet and the Army Council, which ordered on 9 August that Lody was to be tried by a court martial. There was some confusion about whether Haldane had really meant a court martial rather than a military tribunal, and the Adjutant General questioned whether DORA had limited the maximum punishment for espionage to penal servitude for life, rather than the death penalty. Further confusion was caused by the fact that Lody's identity had not yet been fully established. If he really was an American citizen, he was not an "alien belligerent" and could not be court martialled.

On 21 October 1914 the Cabinet decided that Lody should be handed over to the civil police and tried by the High Court. After Lody then made a statement voluntarily admitting his real name and his status as a German subject, the Cabinet determined the following day that the original plan would be followed after all. The venue for the court martial was to be the Middlesex Guildhall in Parliament Square; Major General Lord Cheylesmore would preside, sitting with eight other officers. In hindsight, according to Simpson, it is doubtful whether the charge and eventual sentence were lawful. A later revision of the Manual of Military Law rejected the view that a spy commits a war crime and alluded to the Lody case in suggesting that war treason was not an applicable charge in such cases. Simpson comments that "it is fairly plain that Lody's execution was unlawful under domestic and international law." This objection was not raised during Lody's trial but it would not have done him any good in any case, as there was no appeal for a decision made by a court martial. In the event, Lody's trial was unique. No other spies captured in Britain were tried for war treason under international law. DORA was amended in November 1914 to permit a death sentence to be imposed. All of the subsequent 26 courts martial of accused spies were heard under DORA, resulting in 10 executions.

Another question that arose was whether Lody's trial should be held in public or in camera. Captain Reginald Drake, MO5(g)'s head of counter-espionage, wanted Lody to be tried secretly so that he could implement "an ingenious method for conveying false information to the enemy which depended on their not knowing which of their agents had been caught." He was overruled, as the British Government believed that it would be more advantageous to publicise the threat of German spies to remove any doubt in the public mind that German espionage posed a serious threat in the UK. It was hoped that this would also generate support for the intelligence and censorship apparatus that was rapidly taking shape and would deter possible imitators. In the event, Lody's was the only spy trial in either World War held in public in the UK. In pursuing this policy the government sacrificed the chance to "turn" captured spies and turn them into assets for the British intelligence services. It was an opportunity that was taken in the Second World War when the highly successful Double-Cross System was implemented.

== Trial ==
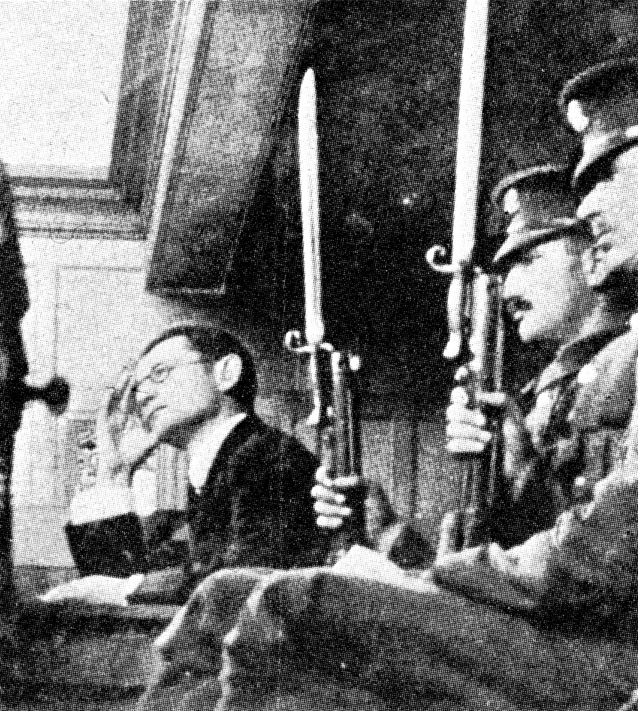
Lody in the dock in the Middlesex Guildhall during his court martial

The court martial was held over three days between Friday 30 October and Monday 2 November. Lody was charged with two offences of war treason concerning the two letters he had sent from Edinburgh on 27 September and Dublin on 30 September. In both letters, the charge sheet stated that Lody had sought "to convey to a belligerent enemy of Great Britain, namely Germany" information relating to the UK's defences and preparations for war. He pleaded not guilty to both charges. He made an immediate impression on observers when he first appeared in court. The Daily Express reporter described him as:

a South German in appearance – a short, well-built man of thirty-eight [sic - actually 37], with a broad, low forehead that slopes backward, black hair parted in the middle and brushed backward, a broad, short nose, large, deep-set, dark eyes with a look of keen intelligence in their depths, and tight-set lips.

Sir Archibald Bodkin, the Director of Public Prosecutions, set out the case for the prosecution. The evidence was overwhelming; the prosecution case highlighted the contents of Lody's notebook and the luggage that he had left at the Roxburgh Hotel, and called a series of witnesses, including the elderly Scottish woman who ran the boarding-house in which he had stayed in Edinburgh and the fashionably dressed Ida McClyment, who caused a stir when she described her meeting with Lody aboard the London to Edinburgh train. Bodkin did not read the incriminating letters aloud, due to the sensitivity of their content, but described them in general terms. The witnesses testified about their interactions with Lody and identified him as the man who had posed as "Charles A. Inglis", though the proprietress of the Edinburgh boarding-house experienced some difficulty. When she "was asked if she could see 'Charles A. Inglis' in court, [she] looked everywhere except at the dock. Lody, who was sitting, stood up and gently waved his hands to attract her attention, while he smiled broadly and almost broke into laughter at the absurdity of the situation."

Late on 30 October, Lody wrote to a friend in Omaha to tell him about his feelings before he began his defence. He told his friend:

I am prepared to make a clean breast of all this trouble, but I must protect my friends in the Fatherland and avoid as much possible humiliation for those who have been near and dear to me.

I am in the Tower [sic – actually Wellington Barracks]. Hourly while I am confined here an unfriendly guard paces the corridor. My counsellor [George Elliot QC] is an attorney of standing, but I ofttimes feel that he is trying to do his duty to his country rather than defend his client. Next week I shall know my fate, although there can hardly be a doubt as to what it is to be. I have attended to such legal matters as were necessary, but whether my wishes will ever be carried out I do not know.

You may have an opportunity to say a word to some of those for whom I feel an interest. Ask them to judge me not harshly, When they hear of me again, doubtless my body shall have been placed in concrete beneath this old tower, or my bones shall have made a pyre. But I shall have served my country. Maybe some historian will record me among the despised class of war victims … Doubtless my demise shall be heralded as that of a spy, but I have spiritual consolation. Others have suffered and I must accept the reward of fate.

The second day of the trial was interrupted when a young man whom The Times described as being "of foreign appearance" was arrested and removed from the court on the orders of Captain Reginald "Blinker" Hall, the Director of Naval Intelligence. The interloper was one Charles Stuart Nairne, an Irishman and former Royal Navy lieutenant whom Hall spotted in the public gallery and considered to be "either a lunatic or a very dangerous person". As Nairne was being removed into military custody, he attempted to shake Lody's hand in the dock.

Lody was then called to give evidence. It was revealed to the public for the first time that he was an officer in the Imperial German Navy and that he had been ordered by a superior officer to spy in Britain. When he was asked for the name of that individual, his composure temporarily deserted him, as The Times' reporter recorded:

For the space of perhaps half a minute the prisoner hesitated, and then, in a voice broken by gradually deepening emotion, said, "I have pledged my word not to give that name. I cannot do it. Where names are found in my documents I certainly do not feel I have broken my word, but that name I cannot give. I have given my word of honour." The prisoner sobbed a moment, then turned pale, and gazed before him in a dazed manner. Recovering his self-possession he said, "I beg pardon; my nerves have given way." A glass of water was handed up to the prisoner.

Lody stated that he had been sent to the UK "to remain until the first [naval] encounter had taken place between the two Powers, and to send accurate information as regards the actual losses of the British Fleet", as well as to observe what he could of Fleet movements off the coast. The court martial went into an in camera session while sensitive evidence was being heard. Lody claimed that he had asked in August to be erased from military service on the grounds of poor health and to be allowed to travel to the United States. This was refused, he went on, but a member of naval intelligence whom he had previously never met coaxed him into undertaking a mission in the UK on the condition that he could go to the US afterwards. Lody told the tribunal that he was not pressured but that "I have never been a coward in my life and I certainly would not be a shirker", and that he had persisted with his mission because "once a man has promised to do a thing he does it, that is the understanding." His services were provided "absolutely as an honour and free", while he had never intended to be a spy: "I was pressed for secret service, but not as a spy – oh, no. If that would have been mentioned to me at Berlin I surely would have refused. The word in the sentence, I do not think it goes together." He claimed that he had "pledged my word of honour" not to name his controller.

Little of this was true, but at the time the British had no way of knowing this. The files of the Admiralstab in Berlin show that he was approached by N, rather than volunteering for intelligence service, entered their employment as early as May 1914 (rather than in August as he claimed), received regular pay rather than being unpaid, and intended to return to Berlin on completing his mission. It is unknown whether he really had any intention of going to the US, and there is no indication from the Admiralstab files that he had been asked to keep his controller's name a secret. After hearing Lody's evidence the court martial was adjourned until the following Monday.

On the final day of the court martial, 2 November 1914, the prosecution and defence put forward their final arguments. Lody's counsel argued for mitigation on the grounds that Lody had "[come] to this country actuated by patriotic German motives, entirely paying his own expenses and carrying his life in his hands, to fulfil the mandate of his supporters." As one newspaper report put it,

He wished to go down to his final fate as a brave man, an honest man, and as an open-hearted man. There was no suggestion of an attempt at pleading for mercy or for favourable treatment. "Englishmen will not deny him respect for the courage he has shown," said Mr. Elliott. "His own grandfather, an old soldier, held a fortress against Napoleon … He knows that he carried his life in his hands, and he stands before the Court in that spirit … And he will face the decision of the Court like a man." Lody was asked if he had any statement to make but said, "I have nothing more to say."

The finding of guilt and sentence of death were pronounced in camera, without Lody present, before the court martial was adjourned.

== Execution ==
No public announcement was made of the court martial's verdict. Instead, the following day, the General Officer Commanding London District, Sir Francis Lloyd, was sent instructions ordering the sentence to be promulgated on 5 November, with Lody being told, and for the sentence to be carried out at least 18 hours later. Great secrecy surrounded the proceedings which, when combined with the short timeframe, caused problems for the GOC in finding a suitable place of execution. He contacted Major-General Henry Pipon, the Major of the Tower of London, to tell him:

I have been directed to carry out the execution of the German Spy who has been convicted by General Court Martial. The time given me has been short, so short that I have had only a few hours to arrange and have been directed to keep it secret. Under the circumstances the Tower is the only possible place and has been approved by the War Office.

While the Tower may have been "the only possible place", in some respects it was a strange choice. It had not been used as a state prison for many years and the last execution there – that of Lord Lovat, the Jacobite rebel – had taken place in 1747. It was one of London's most popular tourist attractions, recording over 400,000 visitors a year by the end of the 19th century, and remained open to tourists even on the day of Lody's execution. During the Tower's heyday, executions had been carried out in the open air on Tower Hill or Tower Green, but Lody's execution was to take place at the Tower's rifle range located in the eastern part of the Outer Ward between Martin and Constable Towers, behind the Outer Curtain wall and out of public sight. The Tower's custodians, the Yeomen Warders ("Beefeaters"), had long since become tourist guides rather than active-duty soldiers, so eight men were selected from the 3rd Battalion, to carry out the sentence.

Lody was informed of his impending execution on the evening of 5 November and was brought to the Tower in a police van. According to the Daily Express, he "received the news calmly and with no sign of surprise." He was held in the Casemates on the west side of the Tower, an area where the Yeoman Warders now live. His last meal was probably prepared by one of the Warders' wives, as the Tower had no proper accommodation or dining facilities for prisoners. While at the Tower he wrote a couple of final letters. One was addressed to the Commanding Officer of the 3rd Battalion to thank his captors for their care of him:

Sir,

I feel it my duty as a German officer to express my sincere thanks and appreciation towards the staff of officers and men who were in charge of my person during my confinement.

Their kind and considered treatment has called my highest esteem and admiration as regards good fellowship even towards the enemy and if I may be permitted, I would thank you for making this known to them.

The Guards apparently never saw the letter; the Adjutant General instead directed the letter to be placed in a War Office file rather than being sent to the regiment.

Lody also wrote a letter to his sister, which was published posthumously in the Frankfurter Zeitung newspaper, in which he told her and his other relatives:

My dear ones,

I have trusted in God and He has decided. My hour has come, and I must start on the journey through the Dark Valley like so many of my comrades in this terrible War of Nations. May my life be offered as a humble offering on the altar of the Fatherland.

A hero's death on the battlefield is certainly finer, but such is not to be my lot, and I die here in the Enemy's country silent and unknown, but the consciousness that I die in the service of the Fatherland makes death easy.

The Supreme Court-Martial of London has sentenced me to death for Military Conspiracy. Tomorrow I shall be shot here in the Tower. I have had just Judges, and I shall die as an Officer, not as a spy.

Farewell. God bless you,

Hans.

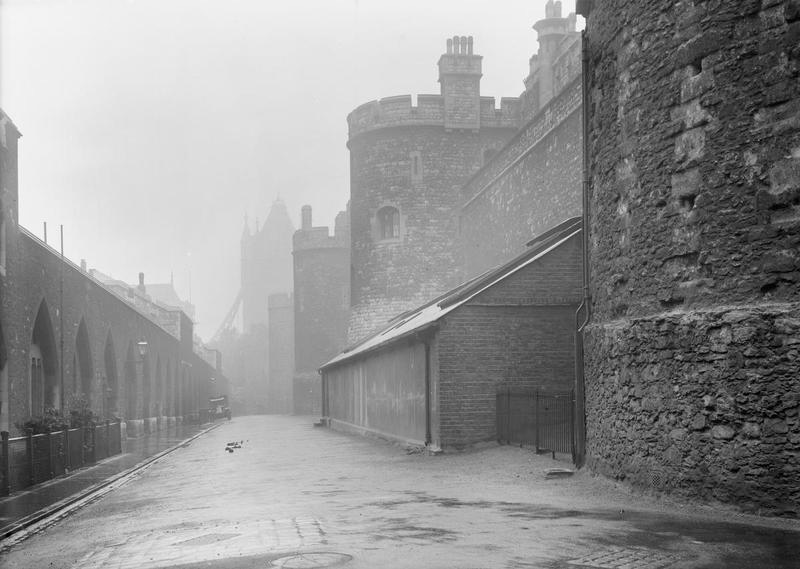
The Outer Ward of the Tower of London on a foggy morning, showing the indoor rifle range (right)

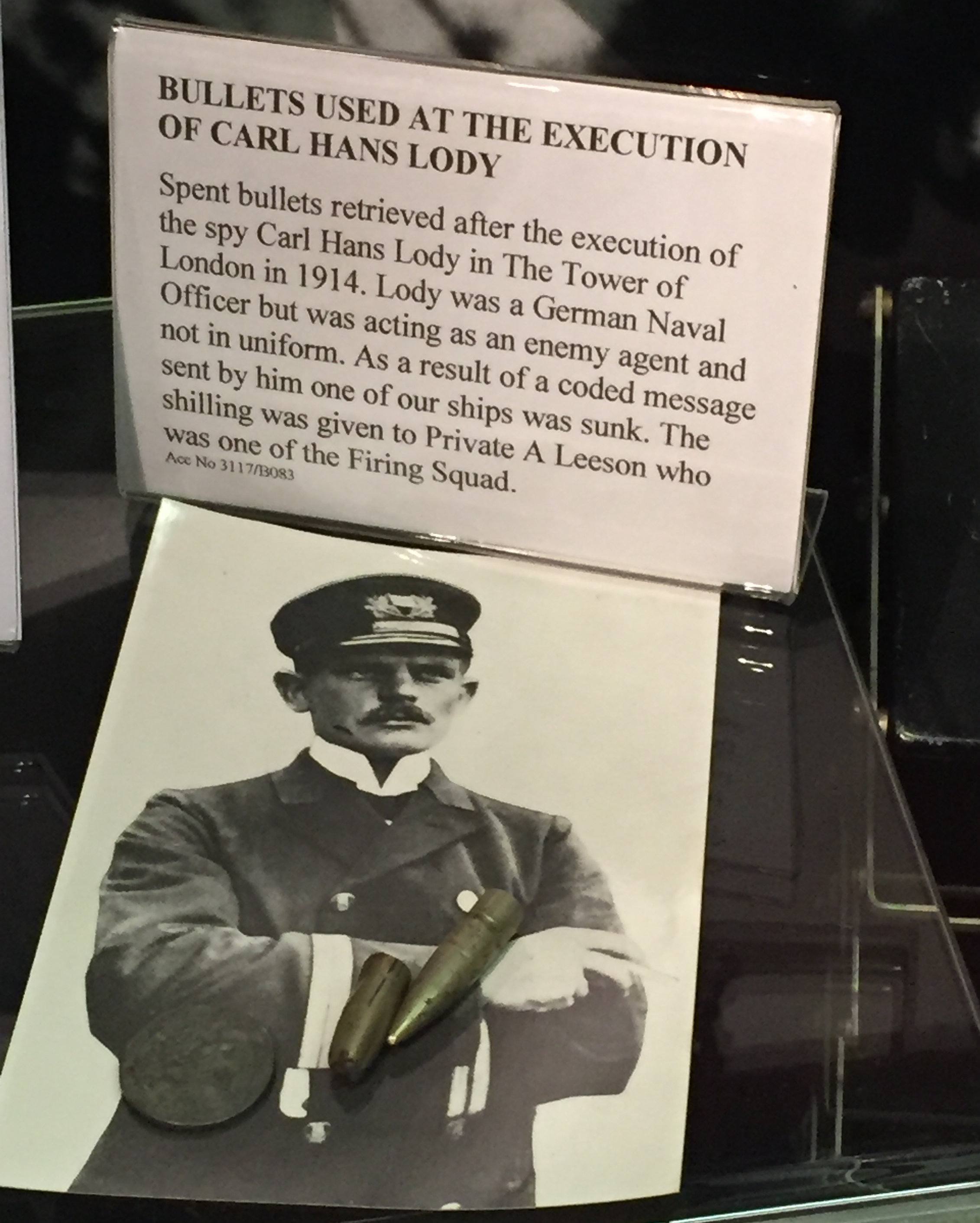
The spent bullets used in the Execution and a shilling given to Pvt A Leeson, on display in The Guards Museum London

Lody also left instructions that his ring was to be forwarded to his ex-wife, which was carried out after his execution.

At dawn on the morning of 6 November 1914, in cold, foggy and bleak weather, Lody was fetched from his cell by the Assistant Provost-Marshal, Lord Athlumney. He asked, "I suppose that you will not care to shake hands with a German spy?", to which the reply came, "No. But I will shake hands with a brave man." A small procession formed up for the short journey to the rifle range, comprising Lody and his armed escort, the Tower's Chaplain and the eight-man firing squad. John Fraser, one of the Yeoman Warders, witnessed it and later described it:

Nobody liked this sort of thing. It was altogether too cold-blooded for an ordinary stomach (particularly that of a soldier, who hates cold-bloodedness) to face with equanimity, and it is not too much to say that, of that sad little procession, the calmest and most composed member was the condemned man himself.

For the Chaplain, in particular, it was a bad time. He had never had a similar experience, and his voice had a shake in it as he intoned the solemn words of the Burial Service over the living form of the man it most concerned . . .

The escort and the firing-party, too, were far from comfortable, and one could see that the slow march suitable to the occasion was getting badly on their nerves. They wanted to hurry over it, and get the beastly business finished.

But the prisoner walked steadily, stiffly upright, and yet as easily and unconcernedly as though he was going to a tea-party, instead of to his death. His eyes were upturned to the gloomy skies, and his nostrils eagerly drank in the precious air that was soon to be denied them. But his face was quite calm and composed – almost expressionless.

At the rifle range Lody was strapped into a chair. He refused to have his eyes bandaged, as he wished to die with his eyes open. A few moments later the inhabitants of the Tower heard "the muffled sound of a single volley". His body was taken away to be buried in an unmarked grave in the East London Cemetery in Plaistow. The War Office issued a terse announcement of the execution a few days later on 10 November: "Sentence is duly confirmed."

== Reaction ==
Lody's courageous demeanour in court produced widespread sympathy and admiration, a development that neither side had anticipated. Even his captors were captivated; although MO5(g) had recommended his execution as early as 3 October, by the time the trial was over, Kell was said by his wife to have considered Lody a "really fine man" of whom Kell "felt it deeply that so brave a man should have to pay the death penalty for carrying out what he considered to be his duty to his country." Sir Basil Thomson of Scotland Yard commented that "there was some difference of opinion as to whether it was sound policy to execute spies and to begin with a patriotic spy like Lody." According to Robert Jackson, the biographer of Lody's prosecutor Sir Archibald Bodkin, Lody's "bearing and frankness when caught so impressed Britain's spy-catchers and prosecutors that they talked about trying to get the Government to waive the internationally recognised rule that spies caught in wartime automatically are put to death. Only the certainty that Germany would not be as merciful to our own spies made them refrain." Thomson also paid tribute to Lody in his 1937 book The Scene Changes:

Lody won the respect of all who came into contact with him. In the quiet heroism with which he faced his trial and his execution there was no suspicion of play-acting. He never flinched, he never cringed, but he died as one would wish all Englishmen to die – quietly and undramatically, supported by the proud consciousness of having done his duty.

Lody's conduct was contrasted favourably with the German spies captured after him, many of whom were nationals of neutral countries, who followed him to the execution chair. Lady Constance Kell commented that "most of the agents employed by the Germans worked only for the money they gained and were regarded with utter contempt". Similarly, Thomson described "the scum of neutral spies", of whom he said, "we came to wish that a distinction could have been made between patriotic spies like Lody and the hirelings who pestered us through the ensuing years". Shortly after Lody's death he was described in the House of Commons as "a patriot who had died for his country as much as any soldier who fell in the field."

The British and German publics also took a positive view of Lody. His trial became something of a celebrity occasion; as The New York Times observed, on the first day, "many fashionably dressed women thronged the galleries of the courtroom" and the final day was attended by "many leaders of London society as well as by prominent jurists, politicians, and military and naval men." The Daily Express opined that "one cannot withhold a tribute to his daring resourcefulness and inflexible courage" and called Lody "one of the cleverest spies in Steinhauer's service", though it advised its readers to bear in mind that he was "a most dangerous spy."

Louise Storz, Lody's former wife, received his ring in early December along with a letter from him. She refused to disclose its contents, saying, "It is his last message to me and in no way concerns anyone else. The ring had also been our wedding ring." She spoke of her reaction to his death in an interview in November 1914 with The Kansas City Star while visiting Excelsior Springs, Missouri. She said:

My nerves are completely upset and I have come to this quiet place where I hope to escape even the loving sympathy of my many friends in Omaha. I want to forget. But the awfulness of such a fate, I fear, I cannot soon erase from my memory ... He was so fine in so many ways. Of fine learning, an accomplished linguist, and of high courage. He used to talk entrancingly of his love and devotion to his country. It must have been a beautiful thing, according to his way of thinking, to die if need be for his Fatherland. But I want to forget. I owe it to myself and my parents to call the chapter closed.

Her father refused to comment, saying that his interest in the Lody case was "only a passing one". A rumour had it that the German government paid Louise Storz $15,000 in compensation for her ex-husband's death, but she denied this in 1915.

In Germany, Lody's home town of Nordhausen planted an oak tree in his memory. Newspaper commentary was limited; the first article about the case that The Times noted was only published around 19 November, in the Frankfurter Zeitung, in which a pseudonymous columnist suggested that the British might have been tempted to show Lody mercy: "I myself am convinced that the noble manliness with which this strong German composure bore itself before the Court touched the heart of the Judge, that the Judge said "If only we English had many such Hans Lodys!" and that Hans Lody lives ... We shall not forget him, for he staked his country more than his life – his name and his honour." A death notice was published in early December in the Stuttgarter Neues Tagblatt, stating that he had "died the hero's death for the Fatherland in England, November 6".

Lody's death produced a low-key response from the German government. The Admiralstab recommended at the end of 1914 that he should be awarded a posthumous Iron Cross, Second Class, and argued that the recruitment of naval agents would be assisted if espionage could be rewarded with such a prestigious medal. The Kaiser agreed, though not without some reluctance.

The bravery Lody exhibited during his trial and execution was praised by many post-war British writers. Sir George Aston, writing in his 1930 book Secret Service, called on his readers to "pay a tribute to a real German spy of the highest type ... Karl Lody", while John Bulloch commented in his 1963 history of MI5 that Lody's bearing made him "something of a hero even in the country against which he was working." E.T. Woodhall, a former detective, collected accounts from officers who had been involved in the investigation and wrote in 1932: "They are unanimous in their admiration for his manly and brazen qualities, but they all criticise his amazing lack of caution ... He was admired by everybody for his bravery and straightforward, patriotic devotion to his country."

Lody may have had more complex motives than simple patriotism. Thomas Boghardt notes the "exceptional" way in which Lody bore himself at his trial, pointing out that "virtually all other German agents accused of espionage understandably tried to deny or minimise their involvement with N". Boghardt had the advantage of being able to review the Admiralstab's files on the case and highlights "small but important changes", or rather discrepancies, between Lody's statements in court and the facts preserved in the case files. As Boghardt puts it,

All this suggests that Lody was less concerned with averting a harsh sentence than he was with projecting a certain image of himself, that of a patriot who, despite his reluctance to join the secret service, rendered his fatherland a final service before starting a new life in America; in short, a 'man of honour' rather than a traitorous spy. Until his death, Lody conformed superbly to this image ... During the last weeks of his life, Lody tried to shatter the negative image usually attached to spies, and in this regard he was utterly successful.

Lody, suggests Boghardt, "had accepted his trial and probable execution as a form of expiation for events that had occurred long before his becoming a secret agent." He raises the possibility that Lody was motivated by what had happened two years earlier in Omaha, when Lody had responded to the accusations of being a wife-beater by declaring that he would "defend the honour of a gentleman". Boghardt comments that "his eagerness to display his honour may indicate a concern that others doubted this very quality in him. While presenting himself to the world as a man of honour and accepting his fate courageously, Lody may have found comfort and strength in the thought that whoever had doubted his honour previously would now be persuade otherwise."

== From spy to national hero ==
During the Nazi era, Lody's memory was appropriated by the new regime to promote a more muscular image of German patriotism. An elaborate commemoration of his death was held in Lübeck on 6 November 1934, when flags across the city flew at half-mast and bells tolled between 6.45 and 7 am, the time of his execution. Later that day a memorial was unveiled at the Burgtor gateway near the harbour, depicting a knight in armour with a closed visor (representing Lody), with his hands fettered (representing captivity) and a serpent entwining his feet (representing betrayal). Below it an inscription was set into the gate's brickwork, reading "CARL HANS LODY starb für uns 6.11.1914 im Tower zu London" ("Carl Hans Lody died for us 6.11.1914 in the Tower of London").

During the unveiling ceremony, which was attended by Lody's sister and representatives of the present Reichsmarine and old Imperial German Navy, the road leading from the gateway to the harbour was also renamed "Karl-Hans-Lody-Weg". On the same day, officers from the Hamburg-America Line presented city officials with a ship's bell bearing the inscription "In Memory of Karl Hans Lody", to be rung each 6 November at the time of his death. After World War II, when Lübeck was part of the British Zone of Occupation, the statue was taken down and the niche in which it stood was bricked up, though the inscription was allowed to remain and is still visible today.

Lody was further memorialised in 1937 when the newly launched destroyer Z10 was christened Hans Lody. Other ships in the same class were also given the names of German officers who had died in action. The ship served throughout the Second World War in the Baltic and North Sea theatres, survived the war and was captured by the British in 1945. After a few years in Royal Navy service she was scrapped in Sunderland in 1949.

Lody was also the subject of literary and stage works; a hagiographic biographical account, Lody – Ein Weg um Ehre (Lody – One Way to Honour), was published by Hans Fuchs in 1936 and a play called Lody: vom Leben und Sterben eines deutschen Offiziers (Lody: the life and death of a German officer), by Walter Heuer, premiered on Germany's National Heroes' Day in 1937. It depicts Lody as brave and patriotic but clumsy, leaving a trail of clues behind him as he travels in the UK: wearing clothes marked "Made in Germany", writing naval secrets on the back of a bus ticket which he loses and a Scotland Yard detective finds, coming to attention when an orchestra in London plays the German naval anthem, arousing suspicion when he calls for German wine while writing secret reports to Berlin, and leaving incriminating letters in the pockets of suits which he sends to be pressed. Lody is arrested in London and sentenced to death. Offered a chance to escape, he refuses and drinks a glass of wine with the firing squad, toasting Anglo-German friendship. He is led out to his execution, saying his final words: "I shall see Germany once more – from the stars." The Dundee Evening Telegraph described the storyline as "quaint".

The Lodystraße in Berlin was named in his honour.

== Burial ==
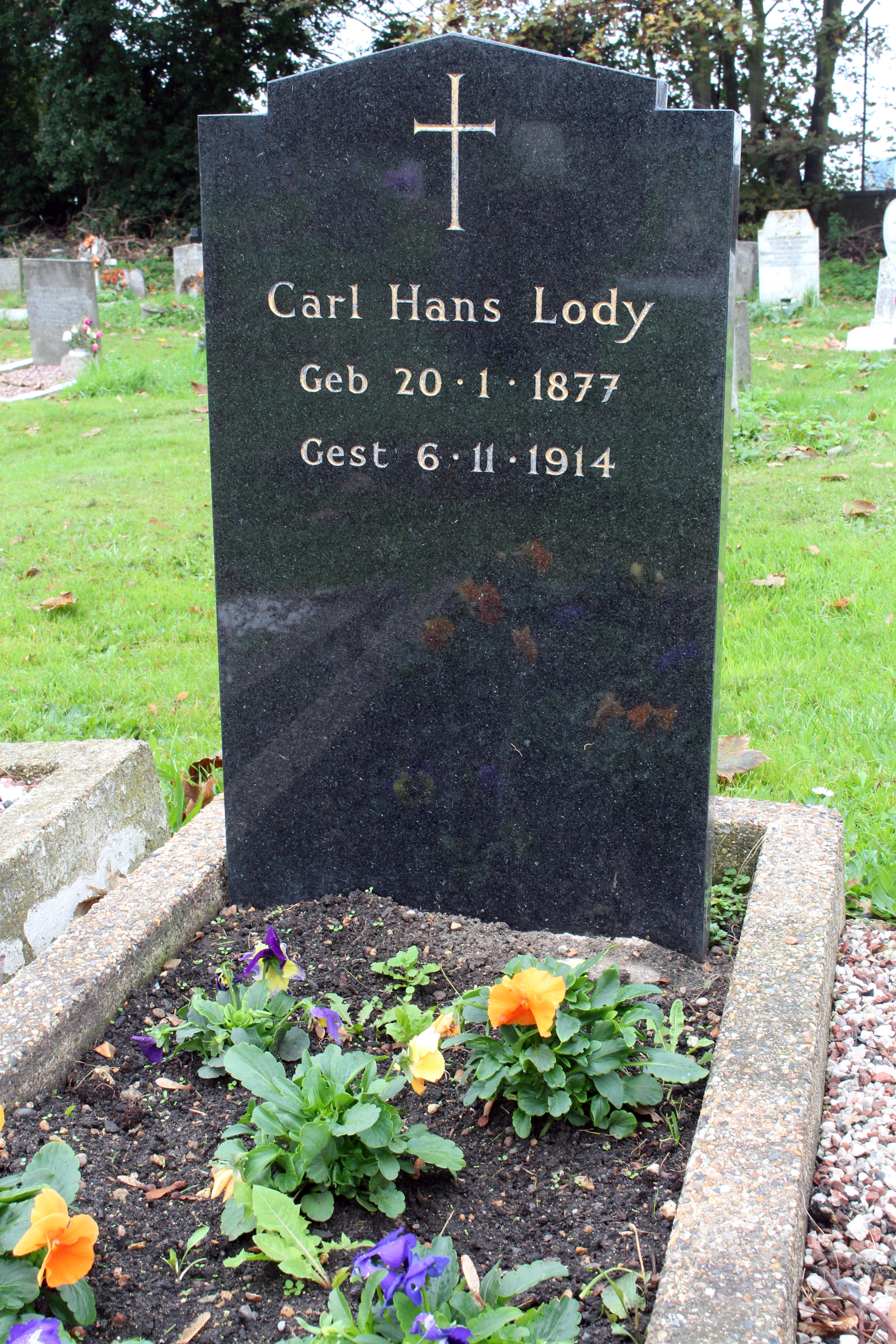
The grave of Carl Hans Lody in the East London Cemetery, Plaistow

The 17-year-old Bertolt Brecht wrote a eulogy to Lody in 1915 in which he imagined the purpose behind the spy's death:

But that is why you left your life –
So one day, in the bright sunshine
German songs should pour forth in a rush over your grave,
German flags should fly over it in the sun's gold,
And German hands should strew flowers over it.

The reality was very different. Lody's body was buried in an unmarked common grave in the East London Cemetery in Plaistow, along with seventeen other men – ten executed spies and seven prisoners who died of ill-health or accidents. It was not until 1924 that the grave received a marker, at the instigation of the German Embassy. Lody's relatives were visiting it once a year and enquired whether his body could be exhumed and buried in a private grave. The War Office agreed, providing that the body could be identified, but the Foreign Office was more reluctant and pointed out that a licence for exhumation would have to be authorised by the Home Office. The Lody family placed a white headstone and kerb on the grave some time around 1934.

In September 1937 the German government again requested that Lody's body be exhumed and moved to a separate grave. This proved impractical for several reasons; he had been buried with seven other men, each coffin had been cemented down and the lapse of time would make identification very difficult. Instead, the British Imperial War Graves Commission suggested that a memorial should be constructed in another part of the cemetery to bear the names of all the German civilians who were buried there. The proposal met with German agreement and the memorial was duly installed. During the Second World War, Lody's original headstone was destroyed by misaimed Luftwaffe bombs. It was replaced in 1974.

One further proposal was made to rebury Lody in the 1960s. In 1959 the British and German governments agreed to move German war dead who had been buried in various locations around the UK to a new central cemetery at Cannock Chase in Staffordshire. The German War Graves Commission (VDK) asked if it would be possible to disinter Lody's body and move it to Cannock Chase. By that time, the plot had been reused for further common graves, buried above Lody's body. The VDK was told that it would not be possible to disinter the other bodies without the permission of the relatives, which would have been an almost impossible task where common graves were concerned. The proposal was abandoned and Lody's body remains at Plaistow.
