= Leonard Appelbee =

English painter and printmaker (1914-2000)

- Born: 13 November 1914; Fulham, London
- Died: 12 June 2000 (aged 85); Aberdeen
- Education: Goldsmiths' College of Art; Royal College of Art
- Known for: Painting, printmaking

Leonard Appelbee (13 November 1914 – 12 June 2000) was an English painter and printmaker, most notable for his portraits and still-life paintings.

== Life and work ==
Appelbee was born in Fulham, the son of a coppersmith. He attended Goldsmiths College of Art from 1931 to 1934, before studying at the Royal College of Art until 1938. In 1939 he produced a poster design, Wimbledon Championships, for London Transport. Whilst at the RCA, Appelbee met his future wife, the artist Frances Macdonald. Appelbee served in the Army throughout World War II. Early in the war he was in charge of a mobile anti-aircraft battery before taking part in classified operations for the Special Operations Executive. At the end of the war Appelbee completed two short commissions for the War Artists' Advisory Committee, one on returning former prisoners of war and the other of a scientist.

After the war, Appelbee had works exhibited at the Royal Academy initially in 1947 and then on a regular basis thereafter. His first solo show was held at the Leicester Galleries in 1948. In 1951, the Arts Council commissioned large paintings from both Appelbee and Macdonald for the exhibition 60 Paintings for '51, which was part of the Festival of Britain celebrations in London. Macdonald contributed a painting of Penrhyn Quarry, entitled The Welsh Singer, whilst Appelbee produced the painting One-man Band. Appelbee taught at the Bournemouth College of Art but lost his job after the College implemented the recommendations of the Coldstream Report on the future teaching of art. He continued to paint and exhibit. He produced a number of fine portraits, notably for both Eton College and Corpus Christi College, Cambridge, but was also well known for his still-life paintings of fish and other sea creatures. He also completed commissions for Sir Edward Marsh and for Essex County Council. In 1970, Appelbee won the Silver Medal at the Paris Salon and in 1977 he had a solo show at Plymouth. After 1977, a badly broken leg inhibited him from standing at an easel to paint and he turned to picture framing and then to writing verse. An illustrated volume of his poetry, That Voice was published by the Hillside Press in 1980. In 1989 Appelbee and Macdonald moved from the West Country to Kincardine-on-Forth and then to Aberdeen, to be near their only daughter.

Works by Appelbee are held in the Imperial War Museum, the Tate and several regional museums in the United Kingdom, including Aberdeen Art Gallery, Leamington Spa Art Gallery and the collection of Leeds University.
