= War treason =

War treason is a term used to categorise "the commission of hostile acts, except armed resistance and possibly espionage, by persons other than members of the armed forces properly identified as such."

According to the 1914 edition of the British Manual of Military Law, espionage could be considered war treason if it was committed by people acting openly outside the zone of military operations. It defined war treason widely as including "obtaining, supplying and carrying of information to the enemy" or attempting to do so.

Sabotage was also considered war treason, as was aiding the escape of prisoners of war. Those accused of the offence were entitled to a trial before a military or civil court, with sentences up to the death penalty being imposed. During World War I, the German spy Carl Hans Lody was tried and executed by the United Kingdom in November 1914 under this juridical basis.
