= First shot memorial =

British war monument in Casteau, Belgium

- Commune of Mons
- For the first British action on the Western Front of the First World War
- Unveiled: August 20, 1939
- Location: 50°30′18.4″N 3°59′52.4″E; Casteau, Hainaut, Belgium
- Designed by: Mr Bertiaux
- The inscription on the memorial reads: This tablet is erected to commemorate the action of "C" Squadron 4th Royal Irish Dragoon Guards on 22nd August 1914 when Corporal E. Thomas fired the first shot for the British Expeditionary Force and Captain C. B. Hornby led the first mounted attack against the Germans

External links to photographs of the memorial
- Memorial, flags, plaque and signage
- Detail of plaque
- The memorial in relation to the plaque commemorating the 1918 advance

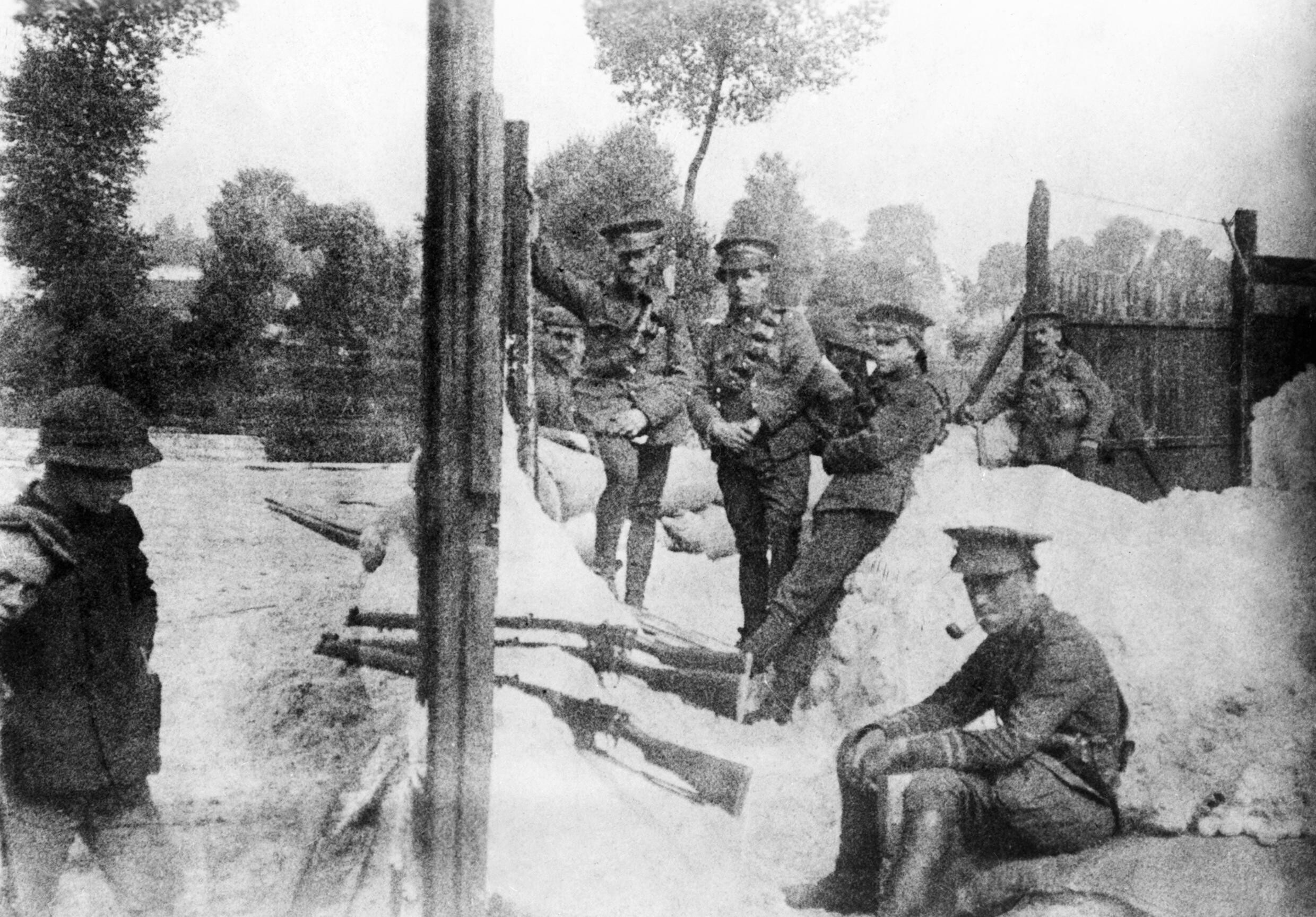
Men of the 4th (Royal Irish) Dragoon Guards, photographed at a defensive position in August 1914

The first shot memorial is the common name of a monument in Casteau, Belgium, marking the first British engagement on the Western Front of the First World War. The monument stands near to the start of a charge made by elements of C Squadron of the 4th (Royal Irish) Dragoon Guards, commanded by Captain Charles Beck Hornby, against cavalry scouts from the German 9th Cavalry Division on 22 August 1914. A number of Germans were sabred and captured before the unit came under fire from a larger German force. The British dismounted and returned fire, with Drummer Edward Thomas firing the first shot by British troops on this front of the war, before withdrawing.

The monument was designed by an architect from nearby Mons, Mr. Bertiaux, and was unveiled on 20 August 1939, just prior to the 25th anniversary of the action and the outbreak of the Second World War. The monument stands opposite one commemorating the furthest advance by the Canadian 116th Infantry Battalion at the end of the war, 11 November 1918.

== Action ==
The 4th (Royal Irish) Dragoon Guards, a British Army cavalry regiment, had arrived in France on 16 August 1914 and were almost immediately moved to the front. The intention was to defend Belgium which, with France and Luxembourg, had been invaded by the Germans as part of the Battle of the Frontiers. The 4th Dragoon Guards scouted the advance of the rest of the 1st Cavalry Division. Soon after crossing the Belgian border 4th Dragoon Guards scout observed parties of German cavalry and on 22 August the regiment's C Squadron, under Major Tom Bridges, was ordered to investigate.

At around 6:30 am C Squadron reached a crossroads south of the village of Casteau and began watering their horses. They heard from refugees that a party of 4-5 German cavalry were approaching. The squadron's 4th Troop dismounted and made ready with their carbines while 1st Troop, under Captain Charles Beck Hornby remained on their horses, ready to charge with the sabre. The German party, who were from the 4th (Westphalian) Cuirassier regiment (part of the 9th Cavalry Division), did not notice the British cavalry until just after they turned back for Casteau. Hornby's 1st Troop charged them immediately while 4th Troop remounted and the remainder of the squadron followed up.

The Cuirassiers were joined at Casteau by a six-man picquet of the 13th Uhlan Regiment. 1st Troop closed with the Germans and engaged in hand-to-hand combat; the British claimed several Germans wounded and Hornby is credited as becoming the first British officer to draw blood in the war, having sabred a German. The Germans fell back and, being reinforced, dismounted to open fire on the British cavalry; it was around 7:00 am. C Squadron's 4th Troop were ordered to dismount and return fire. The troop's Drummer Edward Thomas was the first to open fire aiming at a German officer some 400 yards (370 m) away. Thomas saw the man fall to the ground but did not know if he had hit him. Being outnumbered the British withdrew, having suffered one man lightly wounded, two horses killed and one wounded. Several German soldiers were taken prisoner, some of whom were wounded and received treatment from the Dragoon Guards' medical officer. The records of the 4th Cuirassiers note losing three men captured, one missing (who rejoined the regiment later that day), no wounded or killed and one horse grazed. The action was a prelude to the following day's Battle of Mons which led to the Great Retreat of the British forces to new defensive positions along the Marne.

Hornby and Thomas both survived the war. Hornby received the Distinguished Service Order for the action and retired as a major in 1917 on account of wounds. Thomas reached the rank of sergeant and served in the Machine Gun Corps before returning to the 4th Dragoon Guards, with whom he remained until leaving the army in 1923. He was not aware of the significance of his shot in the action until after the end of the war. Although it was the first shot fired on the Western Front, British forces elsewhere in the world had already opened fire on German forces. By the time the first British shot was fired Belgium had been almost totally overrun and the French and Belgian armies engaged for some days and had suffered in excess of 300,000 casualties.

== Memorial ==
The action is commemorated as the British Army's first of the war by a stone-built monument with a bronze plaque in Casteau. The monument names Thomas and Hornby and commemorates both the first shot and the preceding charge, but is commonly known as the "first shot memorial". The memorial stands some 2 kilometres (1.2 mi) from the location of Thomas's shot but is close to the starting point for Hornby's charge. The commune of Mons, in which the memorial stands, stated that it was sited here for ease of maintenance, though the real reason may have been to provide a juxtaposition with a plaque marking the furthest advance by British Commonwealth forces in this sector in 1918. The plaque, which is mounted to the wall of a restaurant opposite the first shot memorial, marks the furthest advance by picquets of the Canadian 116th Infantry Battalion at the time of the 11 am, 11 November 1918 armistice.

The first shot memorial was designed by a Mons architect named Bertiaux and was unveiled on 20 August 1939, just ahead of the 25th anniversary of the action. This was just two weeks before Britain and France declared war on Germany, at the start of the Second World War and was six months after the death of Thomas. The memorial lay neglected for many years, discoloured by the exhaust fumes of passing traffic, but has since been restored. A commemoration ceremony at the memorial was held on the 100th anniversary of the action.
