= Curriehill =

Suburb of Edinburgh, Scotland

Coordinates: 55°53′56″N 3°19′5″W

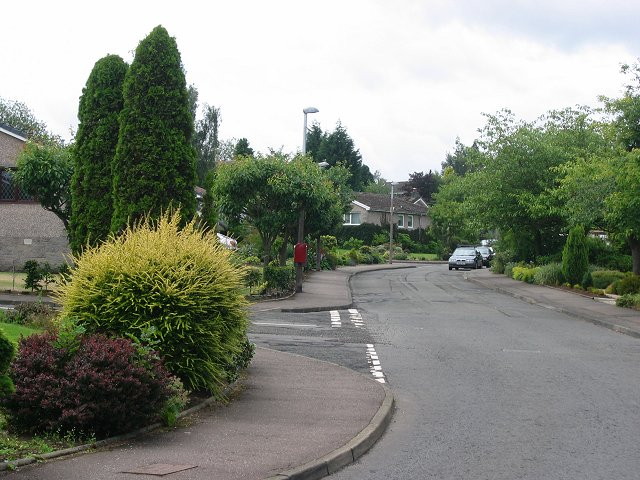
Curriehill - geograph.org.uk - 33401

Curriehill (Scots: Curriehull, Scottish Gaelic: Cnoc a' Churraich) is a suburb of Edinburgh, the capital of Scotland. It is north-west of Currie.

Curriehill railway station is the western terminus of the Edinburgh Crossrail. These trains continue to Glasgow Central via West Lothian and North Lanarkshire.

Curriehill Castle was a stronghold until the 16th century, and a seat of the Skene family. It faced over the Water of Leith to Lennox Tower.

== Notable people ==
John Skene, Lord Curriehill
