= James Johnston (British Army officer, born 1721) =

British Army general (1721–1795)

General James Johnston
- Born: May 21, 1721
- Died: November 26, 1795
- Spouse(s): Lady Charlotte Montagu (m. 1747–1762), Frances (née Carter) Twysden (before 1795)
- Children: Richard Johnstone, Charlotte Frances Johnston
- Military career
- Allegiance: United Kingdom of Great Britain
- Branch: British Army
- Rank: General
- Units: Royal Horse Guards; 11th Regiment of Dragoons; 6th Regiment of Dragoons, Scots Greys
- Conflicts: Battle of Dettingen, Battle of Fontenoy, Battle of Minden, Seven Years' War

James Johnston (21 May 1721 – 26 November 1795) was a general of the British Army, colonel of the Royal Horse Guards (the Blues) then colonel of the Scots Greys where he succeeded his sister's husband, George Preston.

== Early life ==
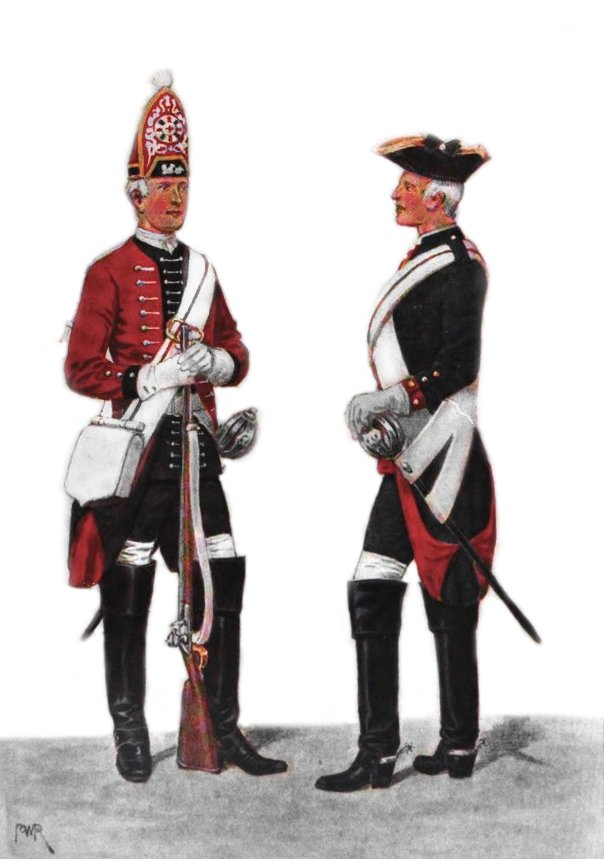
On the right is a trooper of the Royal Horse Guards On the left is a trooper of the Scots Greys Water colour of about 1745

Johnston was the only surviving son of James Johnston (1655–1737) and his wife, Lucy (née Claxton) Johnston. (Note: Johnston was often confused with another army officer of the same name and much the same age, James "Irish" Johnston whose father, George Johnston, was a third cousin of James, sharing descent from Archibald Johnston (died 1619) and his wife Rachel Arnot.) His father's first wife was Catharine Poulett (a daughter of John Poulett, 2nd Baron Poulett). His sister, Lucy Johnston, was the wife of George Preston.

His father was the fourth and second surviving son of Archibald Johnston, Lord Warriston, and his second wife Helen Hay (a daughter of Alexander Hay, Lord Fosterseat). His maternal grandfather was Thomas Claxton of Dublin. Among his maternal family were aunts Frances, Countess of Rosse (and, later, Viscountess Jocelyn), Mary (née Claxton) Carter.

== Career ==
Johnston was first commissioned into the Royal Horse Guards and was present with the regiment at the Battle of Dettingen in 1743 and the Battle of Fontenoy in 1745. He became a major in the regiment on 29 November 1750, was promoted to lieutenant-colonel of the Royal Horse Guards on 17 December 1754 and commanded the regiment in Germany in several engagements during the Seven Years' War.

Desperately wounded at the battle of Minden in 1759 he was promoted to full colonel of Horse, Royal Horse Guards 9 March 1762, (the same day as his 'Irish' cousin was gazetted colonel of Dragoons) (Note: These appointments of the two James Johnstons: Major General, Lieutenant General and General, were identical and gazetted on the same day, one man listed beside the other without distinction.* In addition on 9 March 1762 they were gazetted respectively colonel of Horse and colonel of Dragoons beside each other.) and appointed an aide-de-camp to King George III.

Promoted to major-general on 30 April 1770 on 2 May 1775 he received the additional appointment of colonel of the 11th Regiment of Dragoons in place of the marquess of Lothian and was further promoted to lieutenant-general on 29 August 1777. On 2 April 1778 he was removed from his colonelcy of Royal Horse Guards and a fortnight later appointed colonel of the 6th Regiment of Dragoons. In succession to George Preston, his sister's husband, he was made colonel of the Scots Greys on 4 February 1785, a post he held until his death. On 25 October 1793 he was promoted general.

== Personal life ==
Johnston married twice. His first marriage was on 2 March 1747 to Lady Charlotte Montagu, youngest daughter of George Montagu, 1st Earl of Halifax and the former Mary Lumley. Charlotte's sister, Frances, was the wife of Sir Roger Burgoyne, 6th Baronet. Before her death during childbirth on 28 April 1762, Charlotte and James were the parents of least three sons and three daughters, including:

- Richard Johnstone
- Charlotte Frances Johnston (c. 1749–1820), who married her cousin, Maj.-Gen. John Burgoyne, a son of Sir Roger Burgoyne, 6th Baronet and cousin to John Burgoyne, in 1772. After his death, she married Maj.-Gen. Eyre Power Trench, a son of Richard Trench, MP, and brother to William Trench, 1st Earl of Clancarty, in 1797.

Johnston then married his cousin Frances (née Carter) Twysden. A daughter of Thomas Carter, Frances was the widow of Philip Twysden, Bishop of Raphoe, and the mother of Frances Villiers, Countess of Jersey.

Johnston lived at Overstone, Northamptonshire and in retirement at Weston House near Bath and with a house in St James's Place, Middlesex.

== Note ==
Military offices
| Preceded by Sir James Chamberlain | Major; Charles, Duke of Richmond's; Royal Regiment of Horse Guards; 29 November 1750 – 1754 | Succeeded by Charles Shipman |
| Preceded by John Brown | Colonel of 1st Irish Horse, 4th Dragoon Guards; 9 March 1762 – 2 April 1775 | Succeeded by James Johnston ("Irish" Johnston) |
| Preceded by William Kerr; Marquess of Lothian | Colonel of the 11th Regiment of Dragoons; 27 April 1775 – 1785 | Succeeded by Thomas Gage |
| Preceded by George Preston | Colonel of the 2nd Dragoons; Scots Greys; 4 February 1785 – 24 November 1795 | Succeeded by Archibald Montgomerie; Earl of Eglinton |
