= 6th Regiment of Horse =

6th Regiment of Horse or 6th Horse may refer to:

- 4th Royal Irish Dragoon Guards, ranked as 6th Horse from 1685 to 1690
- 5th Dragoon Guards, ranked as 6th Horse from 1690 to 1746
