= James Johnston (British Army officer, died 1797) =

General James Johnston
- Portrait by Lord Townshend, c. 1751–1758
- Born: 1721
- Died: 13 December 1797 (aged 75–76); Hampton, Middlesex, England

General James Johnston (c. 1721 – 13 December 1797) was a British Army officer.

== Family ==
He was the only surviving son of Captain George Johnston, an army agent (Note: For army officers their banker, broker for the purchase and sale of commissions, agents for transfers and for arrangement of clothing and equipment. Refer to Paymaster of the Forces.) at Dublin descended from the Johnstons of Hilton in Berwickshire, by his wife Hester Bland, daughter of James Bland, Dean of Ardfert and great-aunt to Dorothea Jordan. His sister Mary married Francis Napier, 6th Lord Napier. His paternal grandfather was Sir Patrick Johnston, three times Lord Provost of Edinburgh.

== Career ==
Johnston (Note: Confusion with namesake James Johnston, "Johnston of the Blues" He was known as 'Irish' Johnston because he was often confused with another James Johnston, army officer, of very much the same age, Johnston of the Blues. 'Irish' Johnston's father George was a third cousin of James Johnston son of James Johnston, they shared descent from Archibald Johnston (died 1619) and his wife Rachel Arnot. These appointments of the two James Johnstons: major general, lieutenant general and general, were identical and gazetted on the same day, one man listed above the other without distinction. In addition on 9 March 1762 they were gazetted respectively colonel of horse and colonel of dragoons (dragoons immediately above horse). Before he became a general officer, the other James Johnston's career and his colonelcies were with crack household regiments. Lady Henrietta Johnston with effect from 14 December 1797 received an Allowance as of His Majesty's Royal Bounty, &c. of £200 per annum "In consideration of her late husband's (General James Johnston, late Colonel 6th Dragoons) faithful and unremitted exertions in the Service, during a period of more than 60 years and of the high Rank which he had attained in the Army". Estimates and Accounts, Army returns &c, Session 7, January to 30 July 1812, Vol IX . Retrieved 22 December 2012. The letter of appointment dated 27 April 1775 of James Johnston to colonel of the 11th Regiment of Dragoons may rest among his archived papers with his other commissions but if that commission were for him then it would have been mentioned with his wife's pension and it is not.) joined the army as a cornet in the 13th Regiment of Dragoons on 5 October 1736, and transferred to the Royal Dragoons in 1739, where he rose to the rank of major. On 2 December 1754 he was promoted to lieutenant-colonel of the 13th Dragoons, then on 7 April 1759 went back to the Royal Dragoons as lieutenant-colonel, commanding the regiment in Germany under Duke Ferdinand of Brunswick. He served with distinction at the Battle of Warburg on 31 July 1760 and was wounded at the Battle of Kloster Kampen on 15 October. He was appointed Lieutenant Governor of Nevis in April 1761 (and so was briefly responsible for the juveniles Alexander Hamilton and Frances Herbert Woolward 1761–1831) was promoted to colonel on 19 February 1762 and granted local rank as a major-general, commanding a cavalry brigade in the campaign of 1762. As a mark of esteem he was given a gold snuff-box by Brunswick's nephew Hereditary Prince Charles.

Johnston was appointed Lieutenant-Governor of Minorca in 1763, promoted major-general in April 1770, and made colonel of the 9th Regiment of Dragoons on 2 January 1771. He was retired from his responsibilities for Minorca and made governor of (the garrison at) Quebec on 21 November 1774, though manifestly gazetted Governor of Quebec, the lesser position he held until his death in 1797. He transferred as colonel to the 1st Irish Horse on 27 April 1775 and was promoted lieutenant-general in September 1777. On 14 April 1778 he became colonel of the 6th (Inniskilling) Regiment of Dragoons. 'Irish' Johnston was promoted full general in 1793. On his death he was succeeded as Governor of Quebec by Staats Long Morris.

James Johnston was one of the most celebrated swordsmen of his day. On 5 May 1763, he married Lady Henrietta West, daughter of Lord De La Warr, leaving issue; his widow died in 1817. General Johnston died at Hampton 13 September 1797 in his 77th year and was buried in Westminster Abbey on 21 December 1797.

== Note ==
- Further resources:

Military commissions of James Johnston, 5 October 1736—12 October 1793. Hertfordshire Archives and Local Studies DE/HL/15994-16003
Appointment as Governor of Quebec, Hertfordshire Archives and Local Studies DE/HL/16008

Military offices
| Preceded by | Captain of Major-General Hawley's; 1st (Royal) Regiment of Dragoons; 24 April 1742 – 1745 | Succeeded by John Mostyn |
| Preceded by | Major of Lieutenant-General Hawley's; 1st (Royal) Regiment of Dragoons; 27 May 1745 – 1754 | Succeeded by |
| Preceded by John Toovey | Lieutenant-Colonel of Colonel Mostyn's; 13th Regiment of Dragoons; 2 December 1754 – 1759 | Succeeded by |
| Preceded by | Lieutenant-Colonel of Major-General Conway's; 1st (Royal) Regiment of Dragoons; 7 April 1759 – 1762 | Succeeded by |
| Preceded by | Lieutenant Governor of Nevis; 14 April 1761 – 1763 | Succeeded by |
| Preceded by French occupation of Minorca | Lieutenant Governor of Minorca deputy to Sir Richard Lyttelton; 23 April 1763 – 1774 | Succeeded by Lieutenant-General; James Murray |
| Preceded by Henry Whitley | Colonel of the 9th Regiment of Dragoons; 1771–1775 | Succeeded by Flower Mocher |
| Preceded by James Murray | Governor of Quebec; 1774–1797 | Succeeded by Staats Long Morris |
| Preceded by James Johnston | Colonel of the 1st Irish Horse; 1775–1778 | Succeeded by George Warde |
| Preceded by Edward Harvey | Colonel of the 6th (Inniskilling) Regiment of Dragoons; 1778–1797 | Succeeded by The Earl of Pembroke |
