= Charles Beck Hornby =

British cavalryman

Charles Beck Hornby DSO
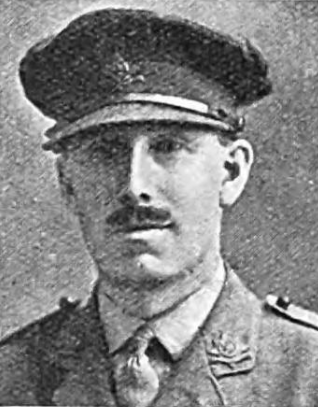
- Born: 7 February 1883; Bangalore, British India
- Died: 10 January 1949 (aged 65); Hexham, England
- Military career
- Allegiance: United Kingdom
- Branch: British Army
- Service years: 1901–1922; 1941–1943
- Rank: Major
- Unit: 4th (Royal Irish) Dragoon Guards
- Conflicts: Second Boer War; First World War; Second World War
- Awards: Distinguished Service Order; Mentioned in Despatches (2); Croix de Guerre (France)

Charles Beck Hornby, DSO (7 February 1883 – 10 January 1949) was a British cavalryman. While serving as a captain in the 4th (Royal Irish) Dragoon Guards, he is reputed to have become the first British soldier to kill a German soldier in the First World War, at around 6:30 am on 22 August 1914, near the Belgian village of Casteau.

== Early life and career ==
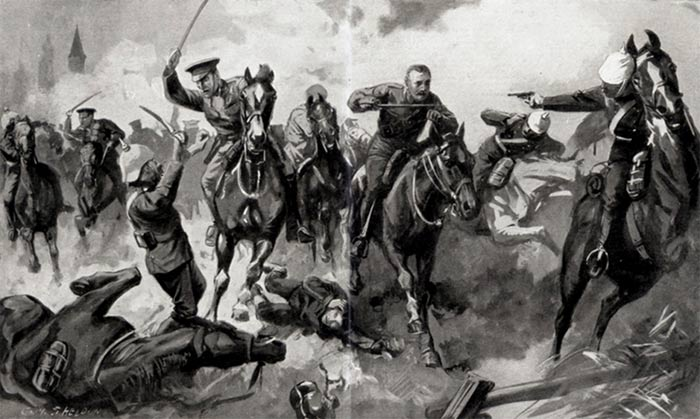
Hornby and his squadron charging against German cavalrymen at Casteau, by Charles Mills Sheldon

Hornby was born in Bangalore, British India, on 7 February 1883. His father, Colonel John Frederick Hornby, served with the 12th Royal Lancers.

Hornby was educated at Harrow School and was commissioned as an ensign in the 4th (Royal Irish) Dragoon Guards in 1901. He was promoted to lieutenant in 1903, and captain in 1909. He served in the Second Boer War and was the regiment's adjutant from January 1911 to January 1914.

== First World War ==
Following the outbreak of the First World War in 1914, Hornby was sent to France with the British Expeditionary Force (BEF), as second-in-command of C Squadron of the 4th (Royal Irish) Dragoon Guards, under Major Tom Bridges. His squadron became the first unit of the BEF to engage the German army outside Mons, Belgium on 22 August 1914.

The squadron was guarding the road from Mons to Soignies, near the village of Casteau to the north-east of Mons (later to become the location of Supreme Headquarters Allied Powers Europe). Two troops were dismounted in ambush, and two in reserve commanded by Hornby. Four patrolling German lancers—4th Cuirassiers of the 9th Cavalry Division—were reconnoitring the route around 6am on 22 August, as the advance guard of General Alexander von Kluck’s 1st Army which was about to advance on Mons. Sensing danger, the German cavalrymen retreated and were pursued by Hornby's two reserve troops, the 1st Troop leading with swords drawn and the 4th Troop following. The Germans retreated towards a larger force of German lancers, which Hornby charged with his men. Hornby is said to have been the first to kill one of the German cavalrymen, fighting on horseback with sword against lance, reputedly using a 1908 pattern trooper's sword now held by the museum of the Yorkshire Regiment. Historian Adrian Gilbert writes that he inflicted "the first casualty on the enemy by a soldier from the BEF." While author Douglas d'Enno was "the first British soldier to kill a German soldier." On the centenary of this action, in 2014, The Yorkshire Regiment museum wrote that Trooper Edward Thomas fired the first rifle shot of the British Army of WW1 and that Hornby's sword, "reputed to be the sword used in the very first encounter of WW1." Authors Desmond and Jean Bowen note that the historian of the 4th/7th Dragoon Guards says that Thomas "undoubtedly fired the first British shot of the war ... [while] Hornby was the first man to kill a German."

After further pursuit, the Germans turned to shoot at the British cavalry, supported by a force of jägers. The 4th Troop dismounted to provide covering fire for the 1st Troop, and Drummer Edward Thomas is reputed to have fired the first shot of the war for the British Army, hitting a German cavalryman.

For his efforts, Captain Hornby was awarded the Distinguished Service Order, gazetted in February 1915, but he was seriously wounded a few weeks after the engagement. He was promoted to major in March 1916, with effect from August 1915, and served in the War Office in England as GSO Grade 3 in 1916 and 1917. He was mentioned in despatches twice, and awarded the French Croix de Guerre in 1917. He went on half-pay due to illness caused by wounds in July 1917, and retired from the army in 1922.

A monument to the action was unveiled in Belgium on 22 August 1939.

== Later life ==
Hornby married Dorothy Henderson in 1914. They had four daughters. He survived the war, and served as a Justice of the Peace from 1924, becoming vice-chairman of the bench of magistrates in Hexham. He served in the rank of captain with the 4th/7th Royal Dragoon Guards in the Royal Armoured Corps the Second World War, from February 1941 to April 1943.

Hornby died in Hexham in Northumberland, with an obituary published in The Times.
