= George Warde =

British Army general (1725–1803)

General The Right Honourable George Warde
- Born: 24 November 1725
- Died: 11 March 1803 (aged 77)
- Burial place: St Mary Abchurch, London
- Military career
- Allegiance: Kingdom of Great Britain
- Branch: British Army
- Rank: General
- Commands: Ireland

General George Warde (24 November 1725 – 11 March 1803) was a British Army officer.

== Life ==
He was the second son of Colonel John Warde of Squerryes Court in Westerham, and his wife Frances Bristow of Micheldever. He was a close childhood friend of James Wolfe, the Conqueror of Quebec. He became a colonel in the Royal Horse Guards, (2 April 1778 Colonel of the 1st Regiment of Horse). In 1773 he became colonel of the 14th Dragoons, then in 1791 was appointed Commander-in-Chief, Ireland, a post which earned him the rank of general in 1796.

Warde died in 1803 and is buried at St Mary Abchurch in London.

== Arms ==
Coat of arms of Warde of Squerries
Crest A wolf's head erased Or. Escutcheon Azure a cross fleury Or. Motto Licet esse beatis (It is permitted to be joyful).

Military offices
Preceded by Daniel Webb	Colonel of the 14th Regiment of (Light) Dragoons; 1773–1778	Succeeded by Robert Sloper
Preceded by James Johnston	Colonel of the 4th Royal Irish Dragoon Guards; 1778–1803	Succeeded by Miles Staveley
Preceded by William Pitt	Commander-in-Chief of Ireland; 1791–1793	Succeeded by The Lord Rossmore
