= Well O'Spa =

Mineral Well

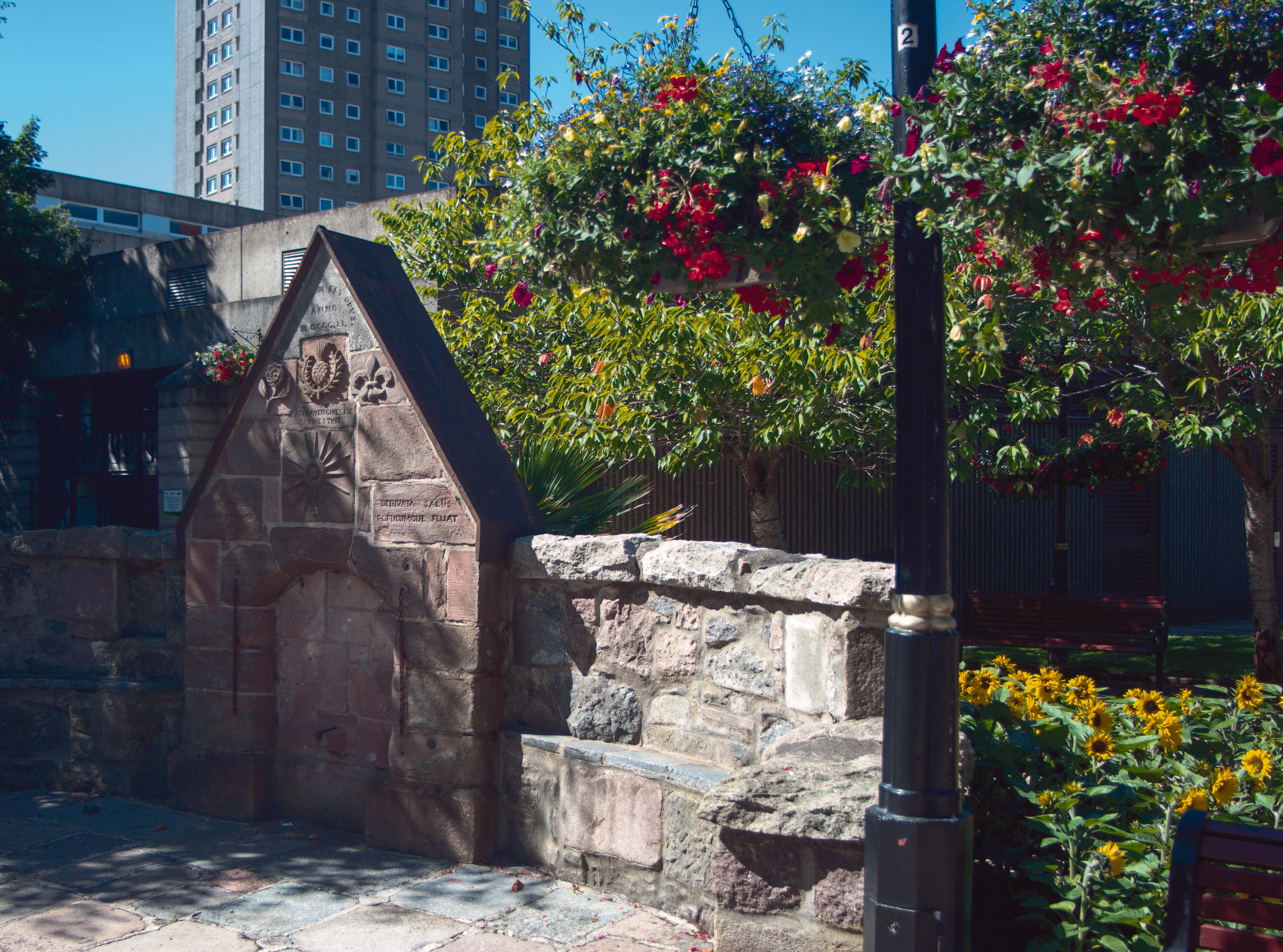
Well of Spa – 2018 Aberdeen

Well O'Spa is the name given to a 15th-century well in the city of Aberdeen, Scotland. This mineral well has been known since the fifteenth century. It has been destroyed by water spates from local burns or streams and moved to a new and safer site on several occasions. It is known as Callirhoe in ancient texts. The ferrous mineral quality of the water is due to a geological feature in the NE of Scotland and Aberdeen. Across Great Britain the place name "well" occurs over two thousand times. There are over one hundred occurrences of the name "well" in Aberdeenshire, Scotland. In the city of Aberdeen there are 27 wells that have provided drinking water for over five hundred years. Many of the actual wells and places with "well" in their name are associated with the Celtic period of Scottish History. The Well O'Spa is protected as a Category B listed building.

== Location ==
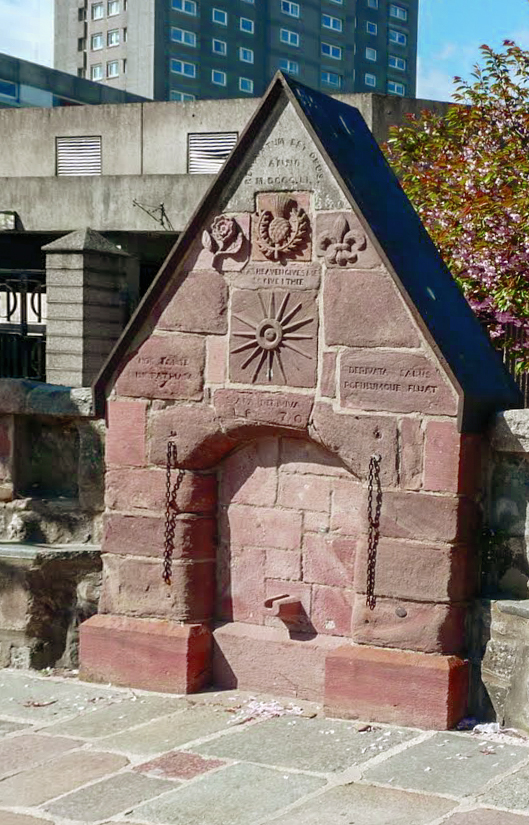
Spa Well showing inscriptions etc.

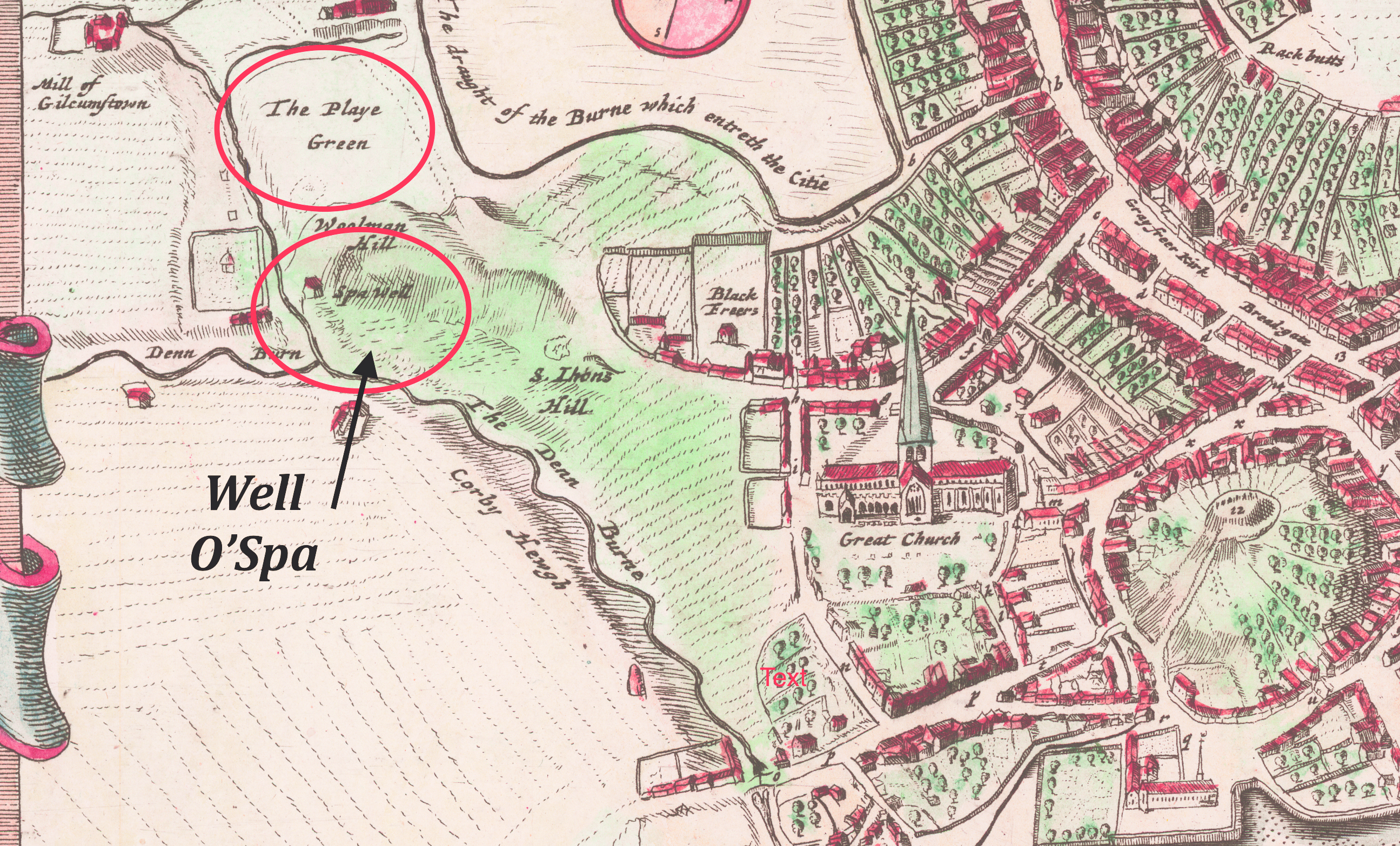
Map of the Well of Spa 17th C.

The Well O’Spa is situated adjacent to Aberdeen City Library, St Mark's Church and His Majesty's Theatre in Aberdeen. On the face of the pediment are figures of the rising sun, the thistle, the rose and a fleur-de-lys. In addition, the following inscriptions:

.. Renovatum est opus Anno MDCCCLI [..] As Heaven Gives to me so I Give to thee..[..] Spada Redivivera 1670…

—

In the fifteenth and sixteenth centuries the well was located adjacent to what was known as the "Playe Green". It now lies in a peaceful square overlooked by a modern car park and an elegant granite building. The well is marked by a red sandstone and granite monument – part of which is from the seventeenth century. It carries the following inscription on its pediment " ..HOC FONTE DERIVATA SALUS; IN PATRIAM POPULUMQUE FLUAT..". This is carved on sandstone blocks. Over time the well has been rebuilt several times and moved to sites within the Woolmanhill area of Aberdeen before reaching its present position. Any water at the site now comes from the mains water supply of the city.

== History ==
Map of "Royal" Aberdeen c.17thC. Well O'Spa, Jamesone's House and Garden, Alexander Skene' House.

The first written record of the well and its curative properties can be found in a monograph published in 1580 called "Ane Breif Descriptioun of the Qualiteis and Effectis of the Well of the Woman Hill Besyde Abirdene". The author was Gilbert Skene who was "Mediciner" or Professor of Medicine at King's College, Aberdeen. Woman's Hill is better known to-day as Woolmanhill and the site of a local hospital. It is likely that the name "Spa" comes from the Belgian town Spa, Belgium. During the fifteenth and sixteenth centuries, Aberdeen had a lively trading relationship with Europe – especially "The Low Countries".

A key figure in looking after the well in the seventeenth century was an Aberdeen landowner and Bailie. In 1670 Bailie Alexander Skene of Newtyle applied to the Council to re-build and refurnish the well. At the same time, he had re-published at his own expense, the tract by William Barclay on Callirhoe. This tract was intended to support the medicinal claims made foe the well. Skene's structure was not completed until 1685. A contemporary account relates the benefits of the mineral water:

[..] the solicitous desire of some diseased citizens who did find renewed experiences of its powerful virtues in the cure of tormenting gravels, deadly colicks and desperate hydropsies [..]

— Scottish Notes and Queries, (1896) IX, p.159

In his application to the Town Council, which was readily agreed to, Skene wrote a letter referring to Jamesone the painter to attract the attention of Council members.

[..] There is the well of Spa, that healthful font,

Whose yr’ne-hewe’d water coloureth the mount. Not far from thence a garden’s to be seen, Which unto Jameson did appertain, Where in a little pleasant house doth stand,

Painted (as I guess) with its master’s hand…[..]

— Skene, A (1685).

In it, he recalls an earlier spate that had destroyed the well :

[..] …the well had been adorned with a long wyde stone which conveyed the waters of the spring with the purtraicture of six Apolsles hewen upon either side thereof which being very old and worne, a virtuous citizen George Jamesone .. did built it of new and put a Tomb of hewen stone over it .. [however] a violent torrent of waters falling into that stream running by it did suddenly overturn it and buried the spring in the ruins so much of the hill having fallen therewith [..]

— Scottish Notes and Queries, (1896) IX, p.159

The stream was the Den (burn) or the Gilcomston Burn.

Skene sums up the benefits of the well thus:

[..] We have a choice Medicinall Spring, called the Well of Spa, at Woolmanhill, built with hewn ston[e], very specific for the Gout, Gravell, Collick and Hydripsie, as the late famous Dr. William Barclay, physician did learnedly describe in 1615 … to which every person concerned to know its vertues and how to use the same, is referred….[..]

— Skene, A (1685)

In 1751 the well disappeared and it was many years before it was moved once again and renovated by Dr James Gordon of Pitlurg. It is believed that two cups hung from chains and the people of Denburn regularly used the water until they were connected to the city's water supply.

== Mineral water properties ==
The well was a source a mineral water with red ferrous sediment. It has been used by generations of Aberdonians such as the eminent seventeenth century portrait painter George Jamesone, known as the Scottish van Dyck. Jamesone suffered from "calculus" or bladder stones. It was firmly believed in his time that the chalybeate properties of the waters cured this and many other conditions – including infertility. Jamesone more than anyone else cared for the well and was directly responsible for one re-construction that was destroyed in 1650.

The water at the Well o’Spa derived its potency from dissolved ferrous carbonate that came from the red sandstone bedrock that underpins the Woolmanhill area of Aberdeen, and secondly rain, containing carbonic acid which percolated into the ground and dissolved more of the iron salts. This resulted in iron carbonate being dissolved in the medicinal spring water. When this iron-rich water emerges at a well site, oxygen in air turns the iron carbonate into an iron oxide. The reddish scum often seen around chalybeate wells is iron oxide. So, when people "take the waters" they are consuming minute quantities of iron salts. These iron salts may have an effect on bladder and other medical problems. It was believed in the past that it did so, people drank it to cure their medical conditions.

== Inscription ==
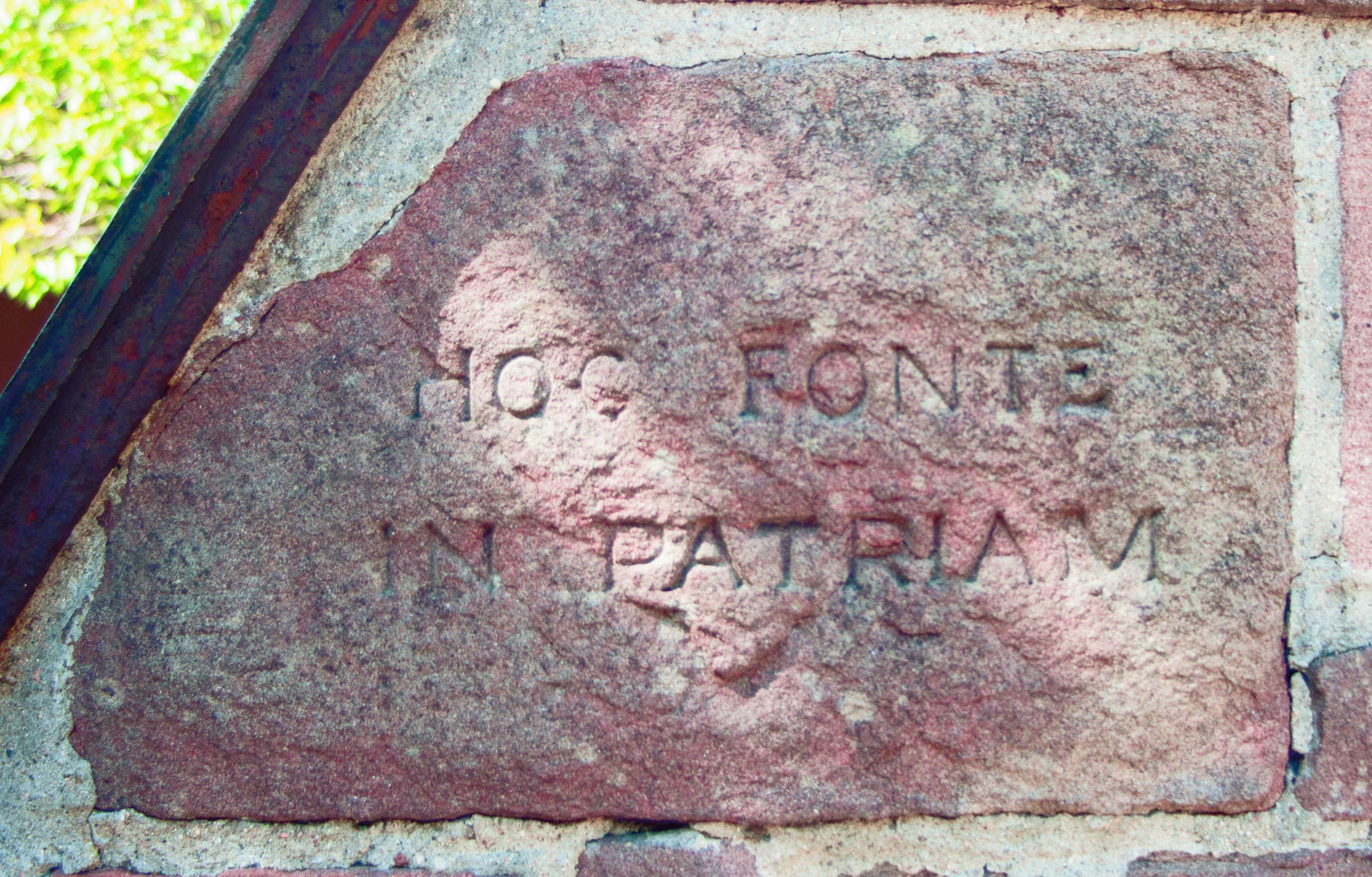
Inscription – left

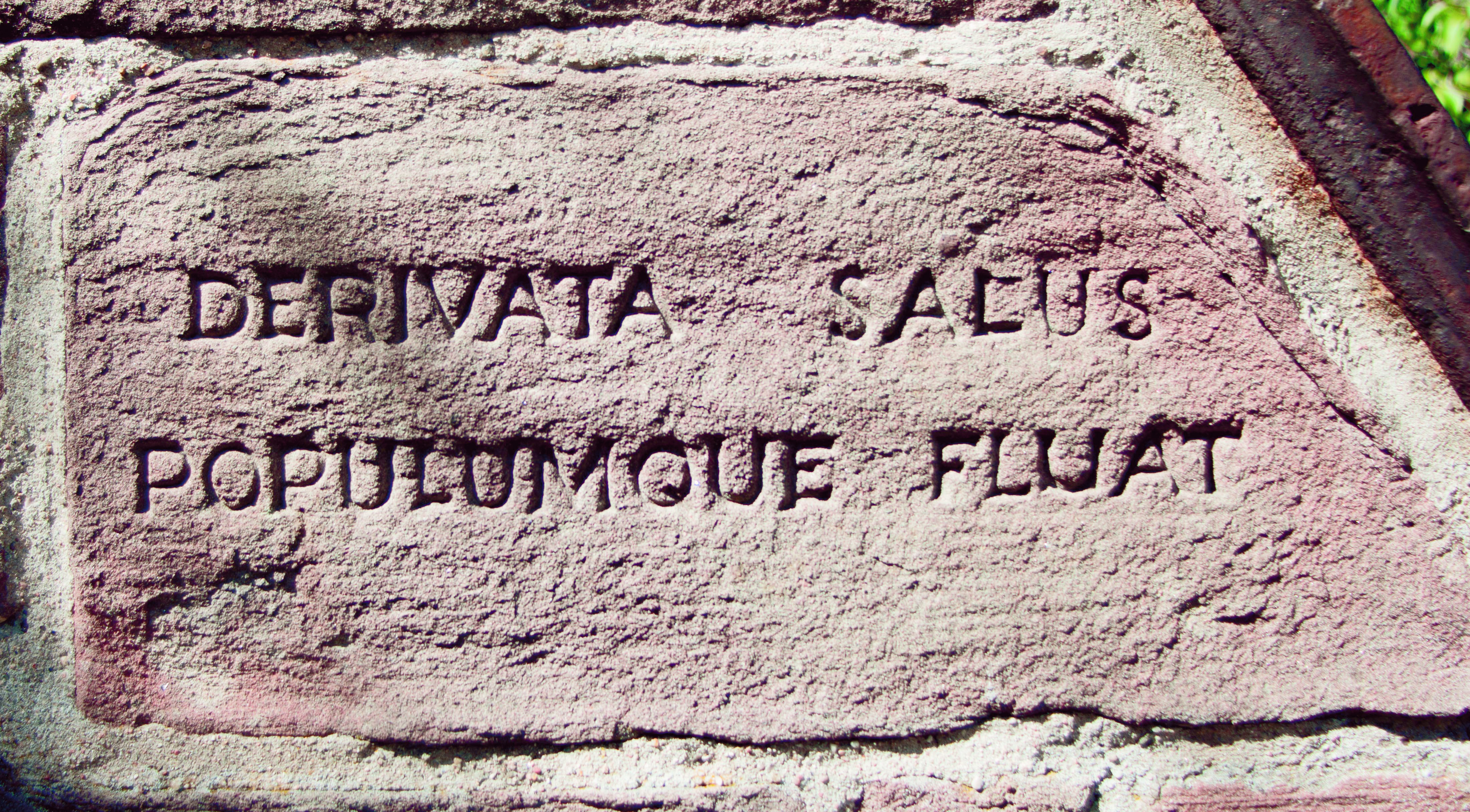
Inscription – right

Since medieval scholars discovered the poetry of Horace, many transcriptions and translations have been made of his odes. Over the last five hundred years transcription and translations of the original medieval manuscripts have led to a variety of Latin texts and translations. Given the context of the Well o’Spa the sponsor and stonemasons in 1670/85 would have wished to have a Classical authority associated with the well. They may have assumed the inscription they chose could be used to give authority or importance to the well and it curative properties. Had they looked at the original context of the ode they might have come to a different conclusion. In Lys Wyness's recent book on the Wells of Bon-Accord she provides both a Latin and a modern English translation. She quotes it as: " ..HOC FONTE DERIVATA SALUS IN PATRIAM POPULUMQUE FLUAT."; she translates this as "may health derived from this spring flow to country and people". Apt it might be imagined for a mineral well. However, there are two problems. First, in 1670 the Horace text was altered by Alexander Skene of Newtyle the sponsor of the renovation so that an inscription better fitted a mineral well. Second, subsequent historians have been "loose" in their transcription of the wells’ inscription and their translations have focussed on the well not what Horace intended. Based on a reliable text of Horace's works, the sixth ode "AD Romanos", reads: (stanza 5) "…fecunda culpae saecula nuptias; primum inquinavere et genus et domos; hoc fonte derivate clades; in patriam populumque fluxit….". Roughly translated as : "..many sinful generations have polluted marriage, the family and the home; resulting in the troubles now experienced by Rome and its citizens..". A little different from what Alexander Skyne intended. Horace wrote the ode in between 30BC and 23BC. Its title is: "Ad Romanos"; that is, "to the Romans". This poem is one of six that are written in iambic style to the citizens of Rome. Horace was a supporter and friend of Augustus Caesar the first Emperor of the Republic. However, he was critical of the social fabric of the Eternal City. He often used his poetry as social comment. In this ode he was not extolling the benefits of mineral water and its health-giving properties as some have assumed. Rather, he was criticising the "sinfulness" of the Roman citizens in relation to marriage and the family. The complete stanza containing the well inscription taken from a reliable medieval manuscript translates as: " .. Generations prolific in sin polluted; first marriage, family and home; From this source streamed the troubles; which have flowed over our land and its people." Nothing really to do with the health properties of chalybeate water. A small change in a Latin quotation in 1670 has thus led to the many misleading translations and claims for mineral waters of the Well o’Spa. In the view of Classical scholars, the inscription on the pediment is defective. ‘Salus’ (health, well-being, safety) has been substituted for ‘clades’ (disaster) and ‘fluat’, present subjunctive (‘may it flow’) for the perfect indicative ‘fluxit’ (it flowed). This leads to a statement about the past referring to what Horace considers a disaster being transformed into a wish for continuing well-being. This results in a stylistic problem. The changes spoil the metre (Alcaics – Alcaic stanza), as ‘clades’ has a heavy first syllable and ‘salus’ a light one; also the first syllable of ‘fluat’ is light, whereas ‘fluxit’ has a heavy syllable.

== Modern times ==
In 1893, the well was once again renovated and moved to the wall of the hospital at Woolman Hill. Initially it was served by water from the municipal supply. In 1976, the well was moved again to its current site on Skene Street close to a municipal car park. The area surrounding the pediment etc. of the well was further enhanced in 1994/1995 with lighting, seating and a garden.
