= Flower Mocher =

British Army general

General Flower Mocher
- Born: 1729
- Died: 1801 (aged 71–72)
- Military career
- Allegiance: United Kingdom
- Branch: British Army
- Rank: General
- Conflicts: War of the Austrian Succession

General Flower Mocher (c. 1729 – 18 July 1801), was a British army officer who served 50 years in the cavalry. He initially obtained a commission with Hawley's Dragoons then, following 12 years service with the Horse Grenadier Guards, he served 17 years with the Dragoon Guards as their Lieutenant Colonel and Colonel. Two years before his appointment as a general officer he was made Colonel of the 9th Regiment of Dragoons in Ireland. After some years service as deputy to the commander-in-chief Ireland he retired in 1794 shortly before his appointment to the rank of full General.

== Family ==
Various inscriptions record earlier generations of his family in the Edmonton, Middlesex and coastal Dorset localities. These people may be his parents: from a tomb in Edmonton churchyard, "Mary relict of Daniel Mocher, 1759".
On 21 July 1801 The Times reported under Deaths: "At his seat on Enfield Chase after a short illness General Flower Mocher, Colonel of the 9th regiment of Dragoons." St Andrew's Enfield contains the monumental inscription "General Flower Mocher, died 18th July 1801 aged 72 years. Jane Mocher his widow died 29th April 1811 aged 78 years." Though his wife had a son, also an army officer, from a previous marriage there is no record of surviving children of Mocher.

== Army career ==
Mocher rose progressively up the ranks during his 50-year career from his start as a 15-year-old sub-lieutenant. Less than 3 years later on 4 June 1747 he followed his fellow officers to kiss the King's hand on his appointment as a captain.

Made colonel of his own regiment of dragoons at age 45 he retired aged 65 with the rank of Lieutenant General being promoted to full General shortly after his retirement.

Appointments gazetted in London: colonel major general lieutenant general general

=== War of the Austrian Succession and Seven Years War ===
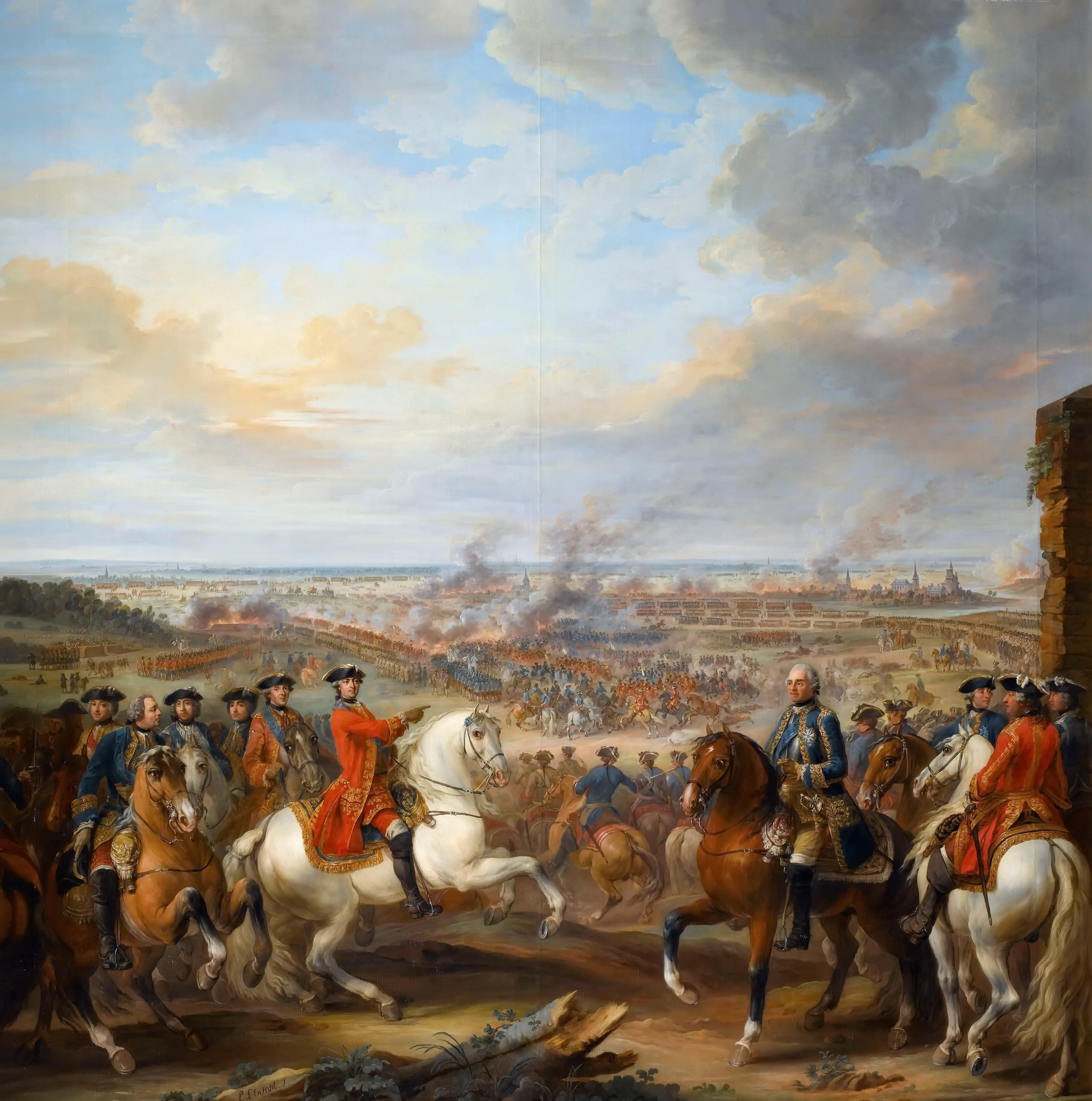
The Battle of Fontenoy, where Mocher distinguished himself

Mocher served at the Battle of Fontenoy in 1745 and there his ability was recognised. He was present at the Battle of Minden on 1 August 1759 and in command of his cavalry regiment but he and his regiment, his rank was Lieutenant-Colonel, were not permitted to take part in the battle by Lord George Sackville for which Sackville was later court-martialled and cashiered. Mocher continued to command the third regiment of dragoon-guards (Sir Charles Howard's Dragoon Guards) in Germany until the peace of 1763.

=== Ireland ===
"In 1778 he was on the staff in Ireland and had the command in the province of Munster until the peace of 1783." (Note: On Friday last Flower Mocher, Lieutenant General of his Majesty's forces and Colonel of the ninth regiment of dragoons, together with Stephen Fuller Esq of Upper Harley Street Cavendish Square, were unanimously elected Burgesses of the Town of Southampton; being the two gentlemen named by the Mayor, in consequence of the Corporation presenting him with that privilege as a compliment for his attention to the duties of the office. News General Evening Post, London, 13 September 1783 – 16 September 1783; Issue 7732)

"During part of that time he had 12,000 men under his orders and so well were those orders executed that the 'whiteboys', so called because they wore white smocks or shirts, who were then in formidable force and had been guilty of great depredations and enormous cruelties were kept in total subjection and the country relieved from the fears of internal commotion."

"He was again on the staff there in 1792 as lieutenant general and second officer in the course of which year the sole command devolved on him by the absence of the commander-in-chief for the space of several months when the country was seriously alarmed and under apprehension of insurrection on which occasion the General's conduct was such as entitled him to the honour of the Lord-lieutenant's highest approbation and to universal applause."

His retirement was signalled by the report from Dublin Castle dated 17 June 1794: "His Majesty has appointed Lieutenant General the Earl of Carhampton to be Lieutenant General upon the staff of Ireland in the room of Lieutenant General Mocher resigned."

== Note ==
Military offices
Preceded by	Colonel; Sir Charles Howard's; 3rd Regiment of Dragoon Guards; 26 May 1772	Succeeded by John Mansel
Preceded by James Johnston (Irish Johnston)	Colonel of 9th Regiment of Dragoons in the Irish establishment 18 April 1775 – 21 July 1801	Succeeded by James, Earl of Rosslyn
