= Gilbert Skene =

Gilbert Skene or Skeyne (1523-1599) was a physician at the Scottish royal court 1522/3 - 1599

He was born at Bandodle, Aberdeenshire. His father James Skene, a notary, was a son of Alexander Skene of Skene and Elizabeth Forbes, a daughter of Lord Forbes. He was killed at the battle of Pinkie. His mother was Janet Lumsden. The lawyer John Skene was a younger brother.

He attended Aberdeen Grammar School then King's College, Aberdeen.

In 1556, he was appointed Professor of Medicine at King's College, Aberdeen (1556-1575). In 1568, he wrote Ane Breve Descriptioun of the Pest which gives symptoms victims of the plague might show, means of prevention and treatment. The book was written in the Scots language rather than Latin usually used in medical works and published by Robert Lekprevik in Edinburgh.

He married Agnes Lawson the widow of an Edinburgh merchant John Uddert, a dealer in furs, ship owner, and brother of Nicol Uddert, in 1569. He moved to Edinburgh in 1575 and bought a house in Niddry Street.

In 1580, he published Ane Brief Descriptioun of the Qualiteis and Effectis of the Well of the Woman Hill besyde Abirdene, concerning the Well O'Spa at Aberdeen.

He was appointed physician to King James VI on 16 June 1581. He was to be paid 300 merks annually. He received £200 Scots annually until 1597. Also in 1581, Gilbert Moncreiff and Skene examined Robert Stewart, Earl of March, in order to demonstrate that he was incapable of consummating his marriage, so that Elizabeth Stewart could obtain a divorce to marry James Stewart, Earl of Arran.

He sold his house in Edinburgh to his brother John Skene in 1593 and possibly retired from his medical practice in Edinburgh. He died in 1599.

His nieces and nephews disputed his goods and property with his widow Agnes Lawson.
