= James Johnston (secretary of state) =

Scottish diplomat and Tory politician

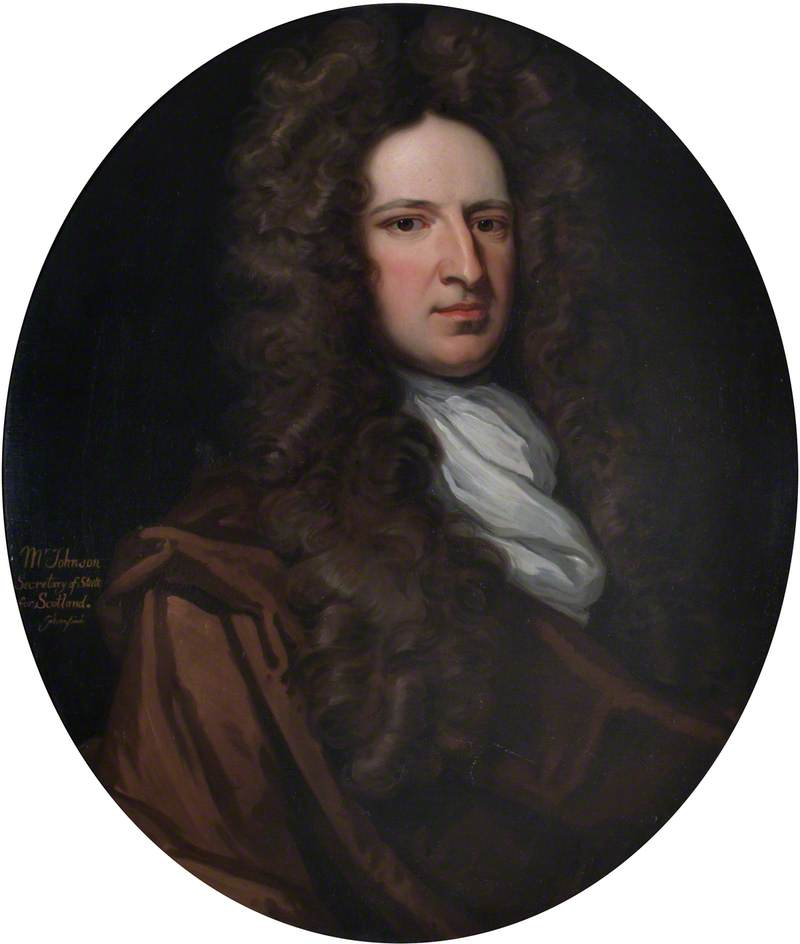
- James Johnston

Joint Secretary of State, Scotland
- In office 1692–1696 Serving with John Dalrymple
- Succeeded by: John Murray, 1st Duke of Atholl

Envoy extraordinary to Prussia
- In office 1690–1692

Lord Clerk Register
- In office 1704–1705

Member of the House of Commons
- In office 1708–1710
- Constituency: Ilchester

Member of the House of Commons
- In office 1710–1713
- Constituency: Calne

Personal details
- Born: baptised: 9 September 1655
- Died: 3 May 1737 (aged 82) Bath, Somerset
- Spouse(s): Catharine Poulett; Lucy Claxton

James Johnston (c. 1655 – 3 May 1737) was a Scottish diplomat and Tory politician who served as envoy extraordinary to Prussia from 1690 to 1692. He also served Secretary of State, Scotland from 1692 to 1696 and Lord Clerk Register from 1704 to 1705. Johnston sat in the House of Commons of Great Britain from 1708 to 1713.

== Early life ==
Johnston was baptised on 9 September 1655, the fourth and second surviving son of Lord Warriston, Archibald Johnston of Warriston, north of Edinburgh, and his second wife Helen Hay, daughter of Alexander Hay, Lord Fosterseat. Johnston's father was executed by Charles II on 26 July 1663 for having served under Cromwell. Johnston, with other members of his family, fled to the Dutch Republic after his father's death. He studied law in Utrecht. After travelling on the Continent, he was appointed in 1687 as secretary to Hon. Henry Sidney. In the autumn of 1687 he travelled to England and took a major part helping Sidney in the Glorious Revolution. He left England in August 1688, and returned in November with William of Orange’s expedition He was rewarded with appointment as envoy to Prussia from 1690 to 1692, taking to the Elector of Brandenburg a gift of the Order of the Garter.

== Secretary of State, Scotland ==
When Johnston came back from Germany in 1692, he was appointed, with John Dalrymple, as Joint Secretary of State, Scotland. He was also a Commissioner of the Scottish Exchequer and made a member of the Scottish Privy Council. He was also a burgess of Edinburgh. He had made a marriage before 1693, but the details are unknown.

Johnston was a man of business and a dedicated Presbyterian, whereas Dalrymple was an Episcopalian. There was a struggle for control between the two men and great animosity arose between them which focused all the existing Scottish rivalries. The administration became paralysed and both men were dismissed from office.

In January 1696 Johnston moved to England, where he married Catharine Poulett, third daughter of John Poulett, 2nd Baron Poulett by his first wife, Catharine née Vere at Salisbury on 18 June 1696. For the next eight years. he skirted round the edges of the court ‘in search of gossip and opportunity’.

== New Party ==
Johnston returned to the front rank of Scottish politics with the ‘New Party’ experiment of 1704, when he entered office along with Tweeddale. In 1704, he was appointed Commissioner of the Scottish Exchequer again, a member of the Scottish Privy Council again and Lord Clerk of the Register, a post worth £3,000 p.a. However after eight years in England he was treated as an outsider, and held with contempt in the Parliament of Scotland. Furthermore he suffered popular hostility, having stones thrown through his windows, and so took refuge in England. He was dismissed from his post as Lord clerk of the Register in 1705, although remaining a Commissioner of the Exchequer until 1707. In the next two years he occasionally supplied intelligence to the Squadrone about the ministry’s attitude to Scotland. He was also used as an intermediary of Lord Godolphin and Lord Marlborough in attempts to persuade the Squadrone to acquiesce in the Union.

== British Parliament ==
At the 1708 British general election Johnston was returned as Member of Parliament for Ilchester on the Tory interest of his wife's family. He was an inactive member and an unenthusiastic Tory. He absented himself from the Tory attack on the ministry’s handling of the abortive Jacobite invasion of 1708 although he did vote against the impeachment of Dr Sacheverell in 1710. At the 1710 British general election he stood as Tory for Calne and after a double return in a contested election, he was declared elected. He again played little part in Parliament, although he was listed as a ‘worthy patriot’ who had helped detect the mismanagements of the previous ministry. He was also a member of the October Club. He was showing signs of ill-health towards the end of the parliament, and did not stand at the 1713 British general election.

== Retirement ==
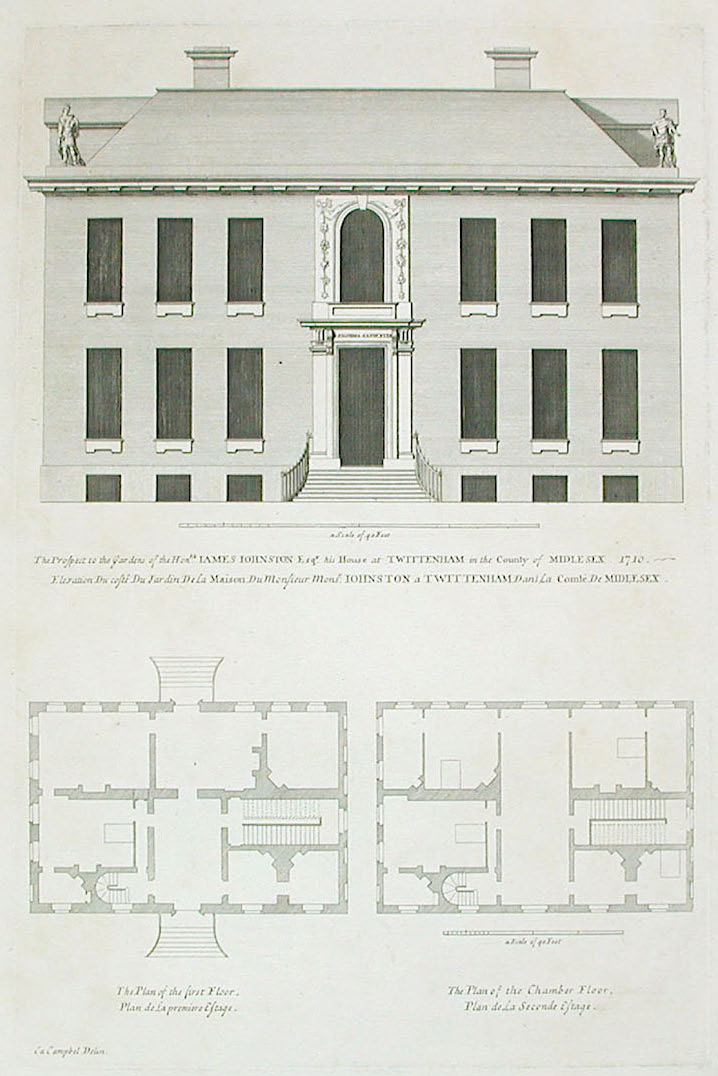
Johnston's house at Twickenham

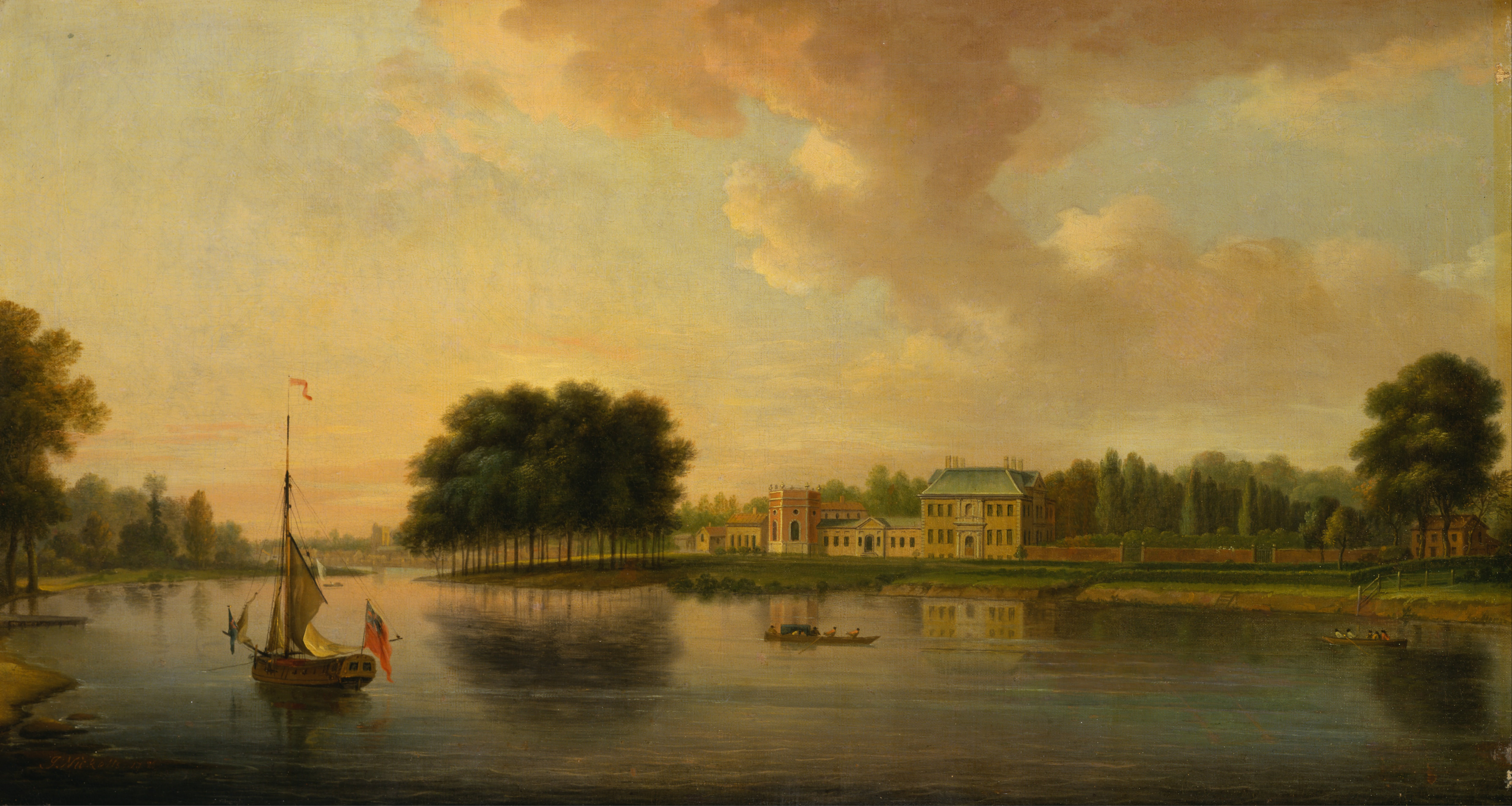
Johnston's house seen from the Thames picture dated 1726(?)

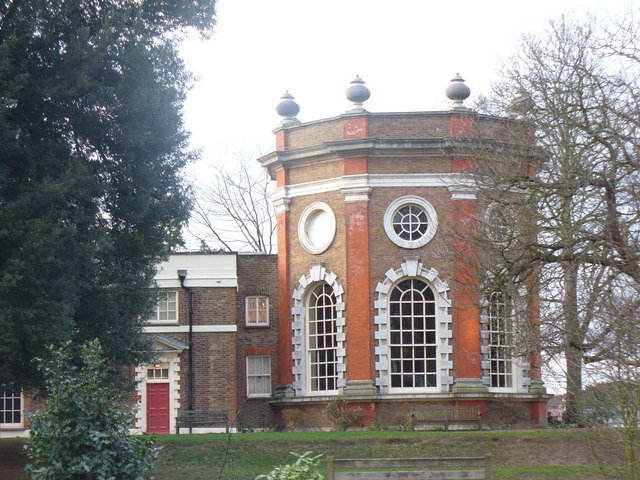
Octagonal room by Gibbs for Queen Caroline

Johnston was one of the first to construct a home on the Thames in Twickenham during the 18th century. He procured a lease in 1702 and commissioned the architect John James to plan and erect a mansion (known after 1813 as Orleans House) – a project which spanned the following 35 years. The grounds were extensive, including the area now known as the Orleans House woodlands. Johnston created a fine garden which "included canals, an icehouse, a kitchen garden, a pleasure garden, a wilderness, a grotto and a fruit garden." A baroque octagonal room, designed by architect James Gibbs, was added in 1720 for entertaining Caroline who regarded Johnston with great favour.

Johnston settled at Twickenham at the end of his political career. In 1716 he married as his third wife Lucy Claxton, daughter of Thomas Claxton of Dublin, sister of Frances Countess of Rosse and Viscountess Jocelyn, sister of Mary Carter, cousin of Edward Lovett Pearce, cousin of Sir John Vanbrugh and great-granddaughter of Sir Dudley Carleton of Imber Court Surrey, nephew and heir of Viscount Dorchester.

It was said George I "often conversed with him very familiarly" and that Johnston was "a great favourite of Queen Caroline, who was much entertained with his humour and pleasantry". It was also said "he keeps out a very great rank, and frequently has Mr. Walpool and the greatest courtiers with him at his country house near London; and the King sometimes does him the honour to dine with him". The King (George I) is also recorded to have been a regular casual visitor to the house.

== Death and legacy ==
Johnston died at Bath in May 1737 at the age of 83 and was buried at Twickenham on 11 May. He and his third wife had one surviving son and one surviving daughter.

His eldest daughter, Lucy, who was baptised at Twickenham on 7 July 1717, married General George Preston, Colonel of the Scots Greys.

His one surviving son, General James Johnston (21 May 1721 – 26 November 1795), an army officer, was Colonel of the Royal Horse Guards then Colonel of the Scots Greys following the death of his brother-in-law, General George Preston in 1785.

James Johnston the younger married Charlotte, daughter of George Montagu, 1st Earl of Halifax. After Charlotte's death he married his own first-cousin, Frances Carter, widow of Philip Twysden and mother of Frances Villiers, Countess of Jersey.

Political offices
Preceded by John Dalrymple, Master of Stair	Secretary of State, Scotland; 1692–1696	Succeeded by John Murray, Earl of Tullibardine
Preceded by Sir James Murray, Lord Philiphaugh	Lord Clerk Register; 1704–1705	Succeeded by James Murray, Lord Philiphaugh
Parliament of Great Britain
Preceded by John Webb; Edward Strode	Member of Parliament for Ilchester with Edward Phelips; 1708–1710	Succeeded by Samuel Masham; Edward Phelips
Preceded by Edward Bayntun; George Duckett	Member of Parliament for Calne with William Hedges; 1710–1713	Succeeded by William Northey; William Hedges
