= George Preston (British Army officer, died 1785) =

British army officer

Lieutenant General George Preston (b. 1707 – 31 January 1785, Weston, Bath) was in the British Army for 61 years and led the Royal Scots Greys.

== Family ==
He was the son of William Preston and Mary Ramsey of Gorton. Preston married Lucy, oldest daughter of James Johnston (Secretary of State). His son Sir Robert Preston, grandson Sir Robert Preston and other grandson Sir Henry Preston were Preston baronets.

== Career ==
In 1739, Preston became a cornet. In a duel on 30 November 1743 at Ghent, Lieut. Preston killed Cornet Alexander Hepburn (brother of Robert Hepburn).

During the War of the Austrian Succession, Preston fought in the Battle of Dettingen (1743), Battle of Fontenoy (1745), Battle of Roucoux (1746), and the Battle of Val (1747), where he was wounded.

During the Seven Years' War, Preston also fought in the Battle of Minden (1759), Battle of Warburg (1760) (where his horse was killed and he was wounded), Battle of Kirch Denkern (1771), Battle of Wilhelmsthal (1762).

He was wounded in the British victory at the gates of Zierenberg (1760). He obtained the Lieut. Colonelcy of the regiment on 25 February 1757.

He took over from John Hale and obtained colonelcy of the 17th Light Dragoons on 2 November 1770. He became major general in 1772, and Lieut. General in 1777. He fought in the Battle of Long Island.

He became Col of the Royal Scots Greys (2nd Dragoons) between 18 Apr 1782 - 3 Feb 1785. (He was followed by his brother-in-law General James Johnston.)

He died in Bath and his tomb is at All Saints' Church, Weston, Bath.

Military offices
Preceded by John Hale	Colonel of the 17th Light Dragoons; 1770–1782	Succeeded by Thomas Gage
Preceded by William Maule	Colonel of the 2nd Dragoons; Scots Greys; 18 Apr 1782 - 3 Feb 1785	Succeeded by James Johnston
