= Edward Thomas (British Army soldier) =

Recipient of the Military Medal

Ernest Edward Thomas
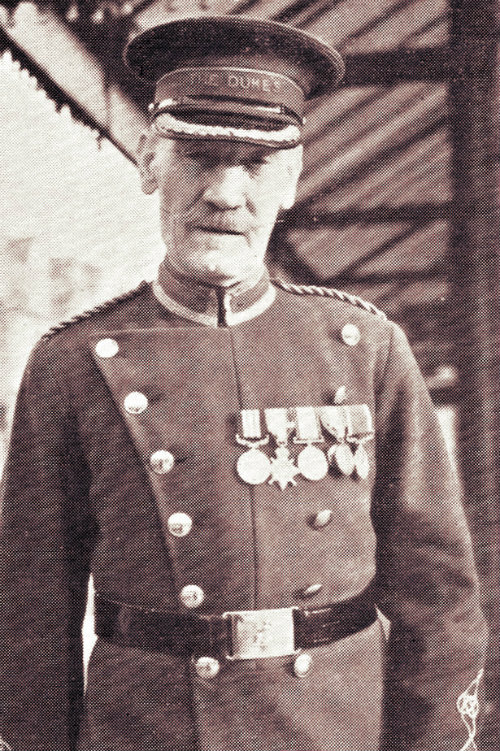
- Ernest Edward Thomas, pictured in uniform
- Born: 16 December 1884; London, England
- Died: February 1939 (aged 54)
- Military career
- Allegiance: United Kingdom
- Branch: British Army
- Service years: 1898–1923
- Rank: Sergeant
- Units: 4th Royal Irish Dragoon Guards
- Conflicts: First World War
- Awards: Military Medal; Mentioned in Despatches

Ernest Edward Thomas, MM (16 December 1884 – February 1939) was a cavalryman in the British Army and drummer. While serving with the 4th (Royal Irish) Dragoon Guards he fired the first British shot of the First World War in Europe, at 7:00 a.m. on 22 August 1914, in an engagement against German troops outside Mons.

== Early life ==
Although it has been reported that Thomas was born in Nenagh, County Tipperary, it has now been established that he was born in London of Irish ancestry. Thomas joined the British Army as a drummer in the Royal Horse Artillery, but transferred to the 4th (Royal Irish) Dragoon Guards before the outbreak of hostilities.

== First World War ==
It was while serving as a corporal in the 4th (Royal Irish) Dragoon Guards that Thomas is reported to have fired the first British shot of the First World War in Europe. He was promoted to sergeant on 5 November 1915 and transferred to the Machine Gun Corps in 1916. Thomas was also mentioned in despatches for bravery. While positioned in a slit trench he advanced on his opposite number after British shelling of the enemy lines, to find all the German soldiers killed. Noting the quality of the German boots, he removed them from several soldiers, tied them together and crawled back to his own lines, where he distributed them amongst his friends. Thomas was awarded the Military Medal during his service.

== Later life and death ==
Thomas returned to the Royal Irish Dragoons at the end of hostilities and was discharged in 1923. He then became the Commissionaire at the Duke of Yorks Cinema. While at work in February 1939, Thomas became ill and subsequently died of pneumonia. He was buried with full military honours.

== See also ==
- Alhaji Grunshi, of the Gold Coast Regiment, the first soldier anywhere in British service to fire a shot in the First World War, on 7 August 1914.
- Charles Beck Hornby, reputed to have become the first British soldier to kill a German soldier, using his sword, in the same action on 22 August 1914.
