= John Skene, Lord Curriehill =

Scottish judge

Sir John Skene, Lord Curriehill (1549–1617) was a Scottish prosecutor, ambassador, and judge. He was involved in the negotiations for the marriage of James VI and Anne of Denmark. He was regent in St Mary's College, St Andrews from 1564 to 1565 and became an advocate in 1575.

== Life ==
He was born at Curriehill Castle south of Edinburgh in 1549. He was the sixth son of James Skene of Wester Corse (b.1505) and Janet Lumsden. The physician Gilbert Skene was an elder brother. Their lands were at Bandodle or Wester Corse, a manor in Aberdeenshire.

In his own writings he mentions his travels, describing the appearance of a travelling salesman in Kraków in 1569. The writer Thomas Dempster mentions Skene's travels in the countries of Northern Europe and his fluency in their languages. James Melville of Halhill said he could give long speeches in Latin, and was "good, true, and stout".

Skene enrolled or matriculated at the University of Wittenberg on 16 March 1570.

As an advocate in 1578 he was involved in the case of Hew Campbell of Loudoun regarding his Provostship of Ayr.

Skene's career was advanced by the marriages of his sisters to Alexander Hay, Lord Clerk Register, and Lord Blantyre, an exchequer official and one of the Octavians. He made an inventory of exchequer records, completed in April 1595, and made notes of the crown revenue and suggestions for the profitable management of royal parks.

As joint Lord Advocate from 1589 to 1594, he was zealous in the prosecution of witches. He was appointed Lord Clerk Register and Lord of Session, with the judicial title of Lord Curriehill in 1594, serving until 1611.

=== Denmark and the royal marriage ===
As a diplomat, Skene went to Denmark to seek an agreement over rights to Orkney, and presented a memorandum on that topic to Sophie of Mecklenburg-Güstrow and the four regents of Christian IV of Denmark at Helsingør on 20 August 1589. He was also given instructions to negotiate the terms of the royal marriage. His companions were; George Keith, 5th Earl Marischal, Andrew Keith, James Scrimgeour of Dudhope the Constable of Tay and standard bearer of Scotland, and George Young. John Craig wrote to Tycho Brahe to introduce other members of this embassy, including the poet William Fowler.

Skene returned to Aberdeen on 22 July 1589 with his colleagues Andrew Keith, and George Young and went to James VI of Scotland at Boyne Castle. An English observer Thomas Fowler reported their news including the Danish opinion that James VI asked for too high a dowry, but they had seen extensive preparations for the marriage including a coach made of silver. According to their report, Anne of Denmark was keen for the marriage to go ahead, and Fowler wrote; "the young lady is so far in love with the king's majesty as it were death to her to have it broken off, and has made good proof (in) diverse ways of her affection, which his majesty is apt enough to requite".

On 22 October 1589, he accompanied James VI on his voyage from Leith to Norway and Denmark to meet his wife Anne of Denmark, and attended the meeting of the Privy Council of Scotland at Oslo on 25 November.

James VI had given Anne of Denmark a "morning gift" of lands and palaces. In the week before her coronation in Scotland the Danish ambassadors travelled to view these places and take formal possession. On 12 May 1589 the envoys were welcomed at Falkland Palace by the keeper, James Beaton of Creich. Skene produced a printed charter of the queen's lands in Fife and as a traditional symbol of the transfer of ownership (sasine), the Danish Admiral Peder Munk was given a handful of earth. After this ceremony, the party rode to the Newhouse of Lochleven Castle to stay the night, then repeated the ritual at Dunfermline Palace, and on 14 May at Linlithgow Palace.

=== Germany ===
In June 1590 James VI of Scotland sent Skene and Colonel William Stewart, Commendator of Pittenweem, with John Geddie as secretary, as ambassadors to Denmark and Germany. The mission was to intended to cement a peaceful league in Europe. They met the mother of Anne of Denmark, Sophie of Mecklenburg-Güstrow at Braunschweig, then went on to meet William IV, Landgrave of Hesse-Kassel at Rotenburg an der Fulda and Christian I, Elector of Saxony at Dresden, and Joachim Frederick son of the Elector of Brandenburg at Potsdam. Skene was ill when he returned to Edinburgh.

James VI gave his wife Helen Somerville £333 from the English subsidy money around this time. On 27 1590 November, Edinburgh town council made his cook, John Lillo, a burgess, for free at his request.

He served as ambassador to Holland from 1591.

In April 1597 he wrote to the Secretary and joked about the expense connected with 30 deer sent from England for the park of Falkland Palace, as "deer of that ilk". He said he had gout or "podagra". James VI was hunting at Hatton House in West Lothian with Sir James McConneil. Another James McConneil alias McSorley was to be knighted, possibly with the designation "of Inchgarvy". They were grandsons of Sorley Boy MacDonnell.

=== Regiam Majestam ===
His compilation of old Scots law Regiam Majestatem is a source of the laws of Scotland previous to James I. He was granted a pension by Regent Morton for preparing a digest of laws. He also produced a Scots law dictionary, De Verborum Significatione. According to the Dictionary of National Biography, "In 1592 he was named one of a commission to examine the laws and acts of parliament, and to consider which of them should be printed, and he was finally entrusted with the preparation of the work. It was published by Robert Waldegrave on 15 May 1597, under the title 'The Lawes and Actes of Parliament maid be King James the First and his successors kings of Scotland, visied, coffected, and extracted forth of the Register,’ and on 3 June the privy council remitted to the lords of session to enforce the purchase of it by all subjects of sufficient 'substance and habilitie'."

=== Later life ===
As a member of the Privy Council, Skene went with others to Stirling Castle in May 1603 to discuss and investigate a controversy involving Anne of Denmark who wished to take custody of her son, Prince Henry. In 1604 he bought the lands of Curriehill Castle. Curriehill is north of Currie, a village to south of Edinburgh. He took "Lord Curriehill" as his title.

He is buried in Greyfriars Kirkyard in Edinburgh. His memorial stands on the north face of the church.

== Ane Account of ane Embassie, 1590 ==
John Skene wrote an account of his embassy to Denmark in 1590, known from a copy made by the antiquary Robert Mylne. This is in the form of a journal of events. Skene left Edinburgh with William Stewart on 9 June 1590 and rode to Berwick upon Tweed and on to London. Their secretary John Geddie spoke to William Cecil to arrange an audience with Elizabeth I of England at Greenwich Palace. On 17 June they came to court again and spoke to Christopher Hatton the Chancellor, the Treasurer (Cecil), the Admiral, Lord Cobham, and Lord Buckhurst. They also spoke to the French ambassador Jean de la Fin, seigneur de Beauvoir La Nocle. They embarked on the George Noble at Leigh on Sea, and after some difficulty sailed to Heligoland and Stade, then crossed the Elbe into Holstein.

On his return, in London, they stayed at an inn on Gracechurch Street. Skene got an appointment with William Cecil, who received him lying on his bed at Cecil House, because he was old and weary. Skene told him details of his negotiations in Denmark, Germany, and the Low Countries. The next day he went with Cecil to Somerset House and waited in the Chamber of Presence until the queen came out at 11 o'clock on her way to Richmond Palace. Skene then went to York House in Westminster and met the French ambassadors Beauvais and Henri de la Tour, Viscount of Turenne.

== Family ==
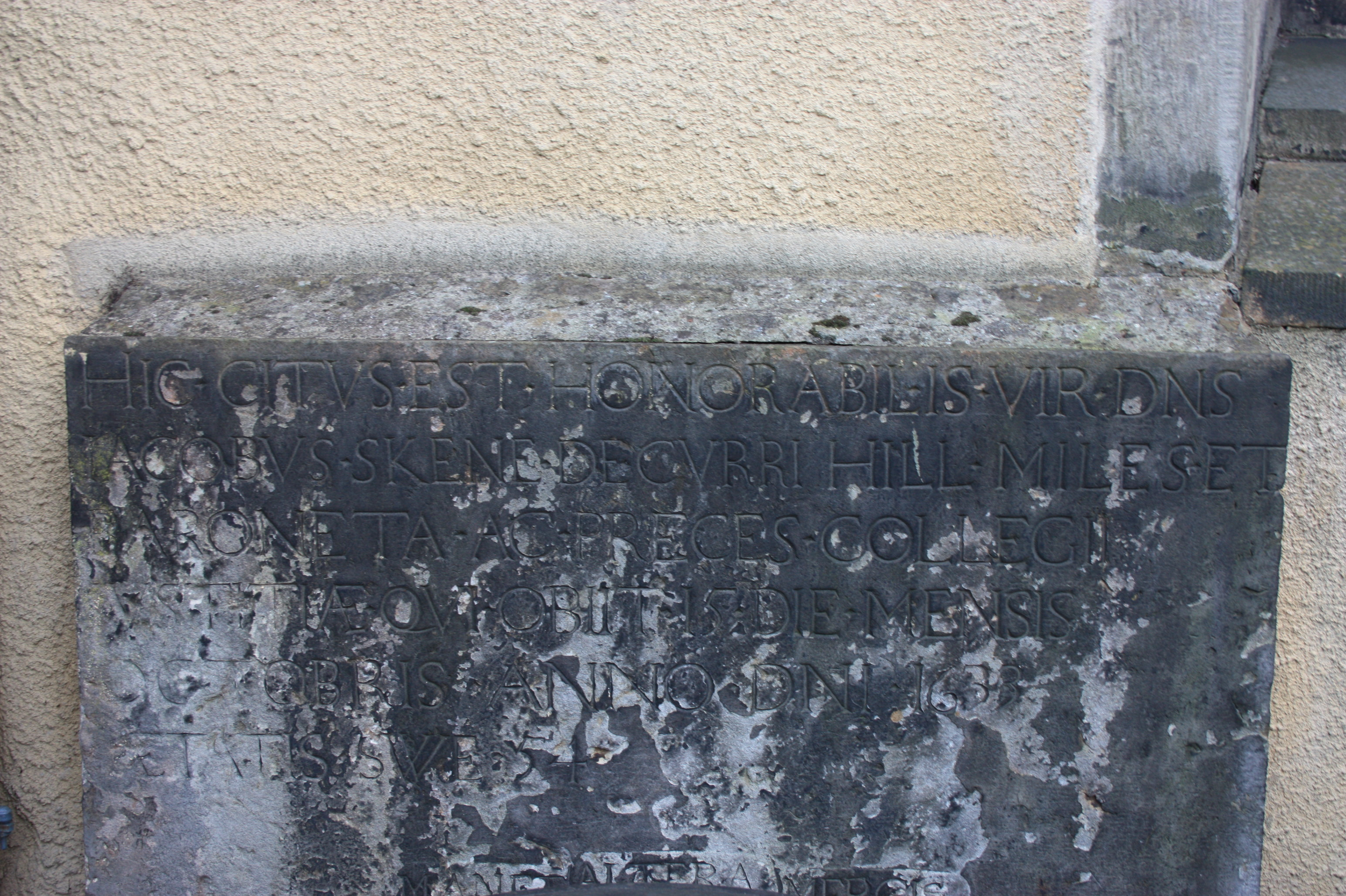
The grave of James Skene, Lord Curriehill (son of Sir John), Greyfriars Kirkyard, Edinburgh

He was married to Helen Somerville of Cambusnethan. Their children included;

- Catherine Skene, who married Alexander Hay, Lord Fosterseat.
- Jane Skene, who married Sir William Scott of Ardross, their daughter Euphemia Scott married William Cochrane and was Countess of Dundonald.
- Euphemia Skene, married Sir Robert Richardson of Pencaitland.
- Margaret Skene, married Robert Learmonth, a son of George Learmonth of Balcomie.
- James Skene, Lord Curriehill (d. 15 October 1633), who married Janet Johnston.
- John Skene of Halyards,
- Alexander Skene, who married Joneta Syms. Their son John Skene was Keeper of the Register of Hornings.
- William Skene.

== Sources ==
- Concise Dictionary of National Biography
