= Alexander Hay, Lord Fosterseat =

Scottish judge

Alexander Hay, Lord Fosterseat (c.1560–1640) was a 16th/17th century Scottish judge and Senator of the College of Justice.

== Life ==
He was the son of Alexander Hay (died 1594) Clerk Register of the High Courts in Edinburgh.

His country estate was at Fosterseat House, in northern Scotland (historically this name appears both near Elgin and near Forfar). Fosterseat appears to be a corruption of Ferester Seat. He also had a house in Edinburgh in or close to the Royal Mile.

He trained as a lawyer and was a judge in Edinburgh. In February 1604 he was elected a Senator of the College of Justice under the title of Lord Fosterseat, elected alongside Sir Lewis Craig of Wrights Land.

He retired as a Lord of Session in 1629 and died in 1640.

== Family ==
He was married to Catherine Skene, the daughter of John Skene, Lord Curriehill. His brother-in-law through marriage as Sir Robert Richardson of Pencaitland.

His daughter Helen Hay (b.1620) was the second wife of Archibald Johnston of Warriston House near Edinburgh and was mother to James Johnston.
