= John Brown (British Army officer, died 1762) =

Lieutenant-General John Brown (died 1762) was a British Army officer.

He entered the Army as a cornet of Horse on 5 August 1704, and served several campaigns in mainland Europe in the army commanded by the Duke of Marlborough. In 1735 he was lieutenant-colonel of the 4th Regiment of Dragoons, from whence he was removed to the lieutenant-colonelcy of the King's Horse (later 1st Dragoon Guards), and on 10 May 1742 he was appointed colonel of the 9th Dragoons. On the appointment of Lieutenant-General Lord Tyrawley to the Horse Grenadier Guards, the colonelcy of the 5th Horse was conferred on Colonel Brown, 1 April 1743. He was promoted to the rank of major-general on 26 March 1754, and to that of lieutenant-general on 15 January 1758.

Military offices
Preceded by Sir John Cope	Colonel of the 9th Regiment of Dragoons; 1742–1743	Succeeded by Henry de Grangues
Preceded by The Lord Tyrawley	Colonel of the 5th Regiment of Horse; 1743–1762	Succeeded by James Johnston
