= Adrian Gilbert =

British author and historian

- Education: Lancaster University
- Occupations: Author and historian
- Children: 3
- Writing career
- Subject: Military history
- Notable work: Britain Invaded
- Website: Adrian Gilbert's official website

Adrian Gilbert is a British author and historian who writes primarily on the subject of military history – particularly relating to wars of the 20th century. Although most of his work is published for adults, he has also written several non-fiction books for children.

== Life ==
After studying history at Lancaster University he spent several years working in book publishing. Gilbert has also contributed to television documentaries and written pieces for newspapers and magazines, including The Sunday Times, The Guardian, Gramophone and The Good Book Guide.

Among his books are Britain Invaded, an imaginary account of a German invasion of Britain in 1940, POW: Allied Prisoners in Europe 1939–1945, a day-to-day account of the lives of Allied prisoners of war captured by Axis forces during the Second World War, and Challenge of Battle: The Real Story of the British Army in 1914.

== Works ==
- World War I in Photographs (1986)
- Modern Fighting Men (with John Pimlott) (1986)
- Illustrated History of World War I (1988)
- Waffen SS: an Illustrated History (1989)
- Britain Invaded (1990)
- Imperial War Museum Book of the Desert War (1992)
- Sniper: One-on-One (1994)
- Stalk and Kill: the Sniper Experience (1997)
- Germany’s Lightning War (2000)
- POW: Allied Prisoners in Europe 1939–45 (2006)
- Voices of the Legion (2009)
- Challenge of Battle: The Real Story of the British Army in 1914 (2014)
- Waffen-SS: Hitler's Army at War (2019)
