= Warriston =

Suburb of Edinburgh, Scotland

Coordinates: 55°58′4.85″N 3°12′1.95″W

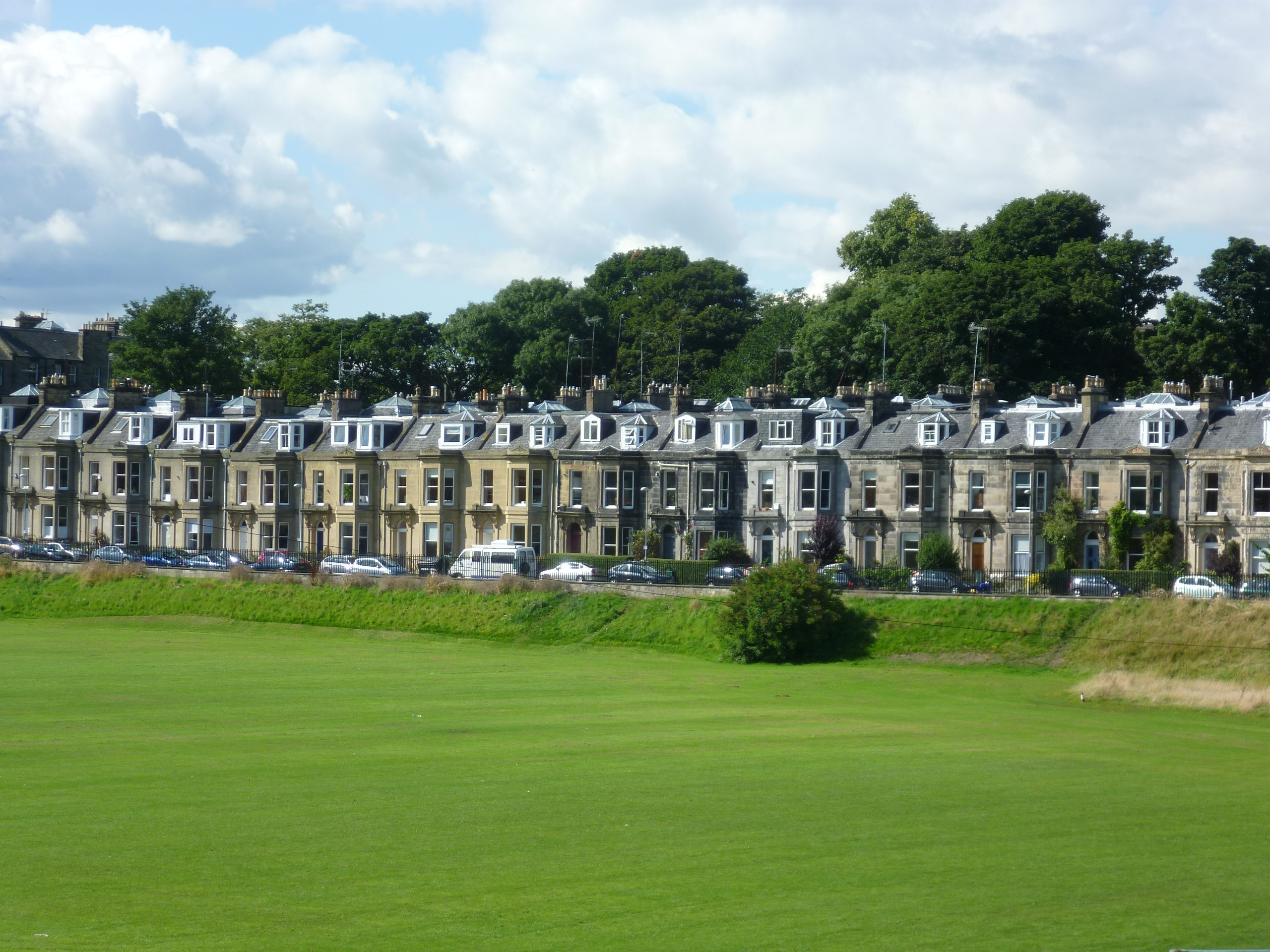
Eildon Street, Warriston

Warriston (/ˈwɔːrɪstən/) is a suburb of Edinburgh, the capital of Scotland. It lies east of the Royal Botanic Garden in Inverleith. The name derives from Warriston House, a local mansion house demolished in 1966.

In July 1600 John Kincaid, the Laird of Warriston, was murdered by his wife, Jean Livingstone, a daughter of the Laird of Dunipace, her two female servants, and his stable hand. The women were captured and sentenced to be burnt.

Warriston Cemetery was opened in 1843 and is now owned by the City of Edinburgh. Warriston Crematorium was opened on 29 October 1929 on the eastern edge of the old cemetery. It was built in 1808 as East Warriston House and converted in 1928/9.

There is a small housing estate near Warriston Cemetery locally known as Easter Warriston.

A large playing field belonging to George Heriot's School extends into the Goldenacre area. It was used in the 1981 film Chariots of Fire for the scene where, for the first time, Harold Abrahams watches Eric Liddell run.

The Water of Leith flows by here. Kirkwood's 1817 Plan of Edinburgh and its Environs shows its north and south banks connected by a line of stepping stones at a ford at the end of present-day Logie Green Road.

== Notable residents ==
In 1848, the Polish composer Frédéric Chopin stayed at No 10 Warriston Crescent as the guest of Polish émigré doctor Dr. Adam Łyszczyński. In 1948 a commemorative plaque to mark the centenary of his visit was placed on the house by the Polish community in Edinburgh. The library at Kórnik near Poznań in Poland possesses an autograph of Chopin's song, 'The Spring', bearing the annotation "Warriston Crescent 1848".

Writer Robert Louis Stevenson was born in Warriston.
