= 4th Royal Irish Dragoon Guards =

British Army cavalry regiment

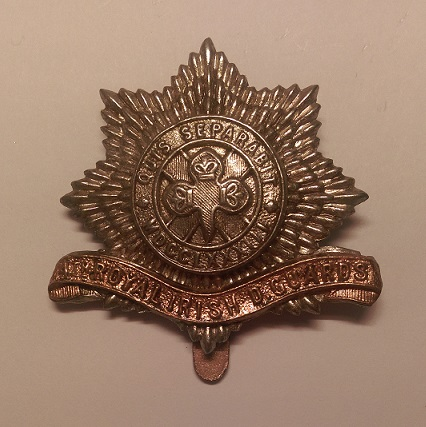
- Badge of the 4th Royal Irish Dragoon Guards
- Active: 1685–1922
- Country: Kingdom of England (1685–1707) Kingdom of Great Britain (1707–1746, 1788–1800); Kingdom of Ireland (1746–1788) United Kingdom (1801–1922)
- Branch: British Army
- Type: Cavalry
- Role: Line Cavalry
- Size: 1 Regiment
- Nicknames: The Blue Horse, The Mounted Micks, The Buttermilks
- Motto: Quis separabit (Who shall separate us?)
- March: Quick: St Patrick's Day; Slow: 4th Dragoon Guards

Commanders
- Notable commanders: Lieutenant-General James Hamilton, 4th Duke of Hamilton Field Marshal James O'Hara, 2nd Baron Tyrawley; General George Warde; General Sir Henry Fane; General Sir George Anson; General Sir Edward Cooper Hodge Brigadier-General Horace Sewell

The 4th Royal Irish Dragoon Guards was a cavalry regiment in the British Army, first raised in 1685 as the Earl of Arran's Regiment of Cuirassiers. It was renamed as the 4th (Royal Irish) Dragoon Guards in 1788 and service for two centuries, including the First World War, before being amalgamated with 7th Dragoon Guards (Princess Royal's), to form the 4th/7th Dragoon Guards in 1922.

== History ==
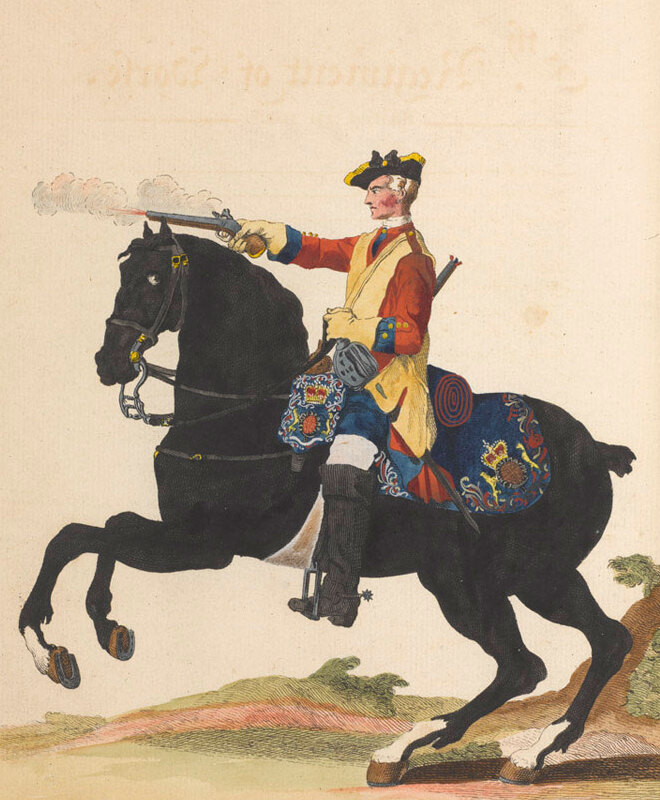
c. 1742 engraving of a regimental trooper

c. 1751 painting of a regimental private

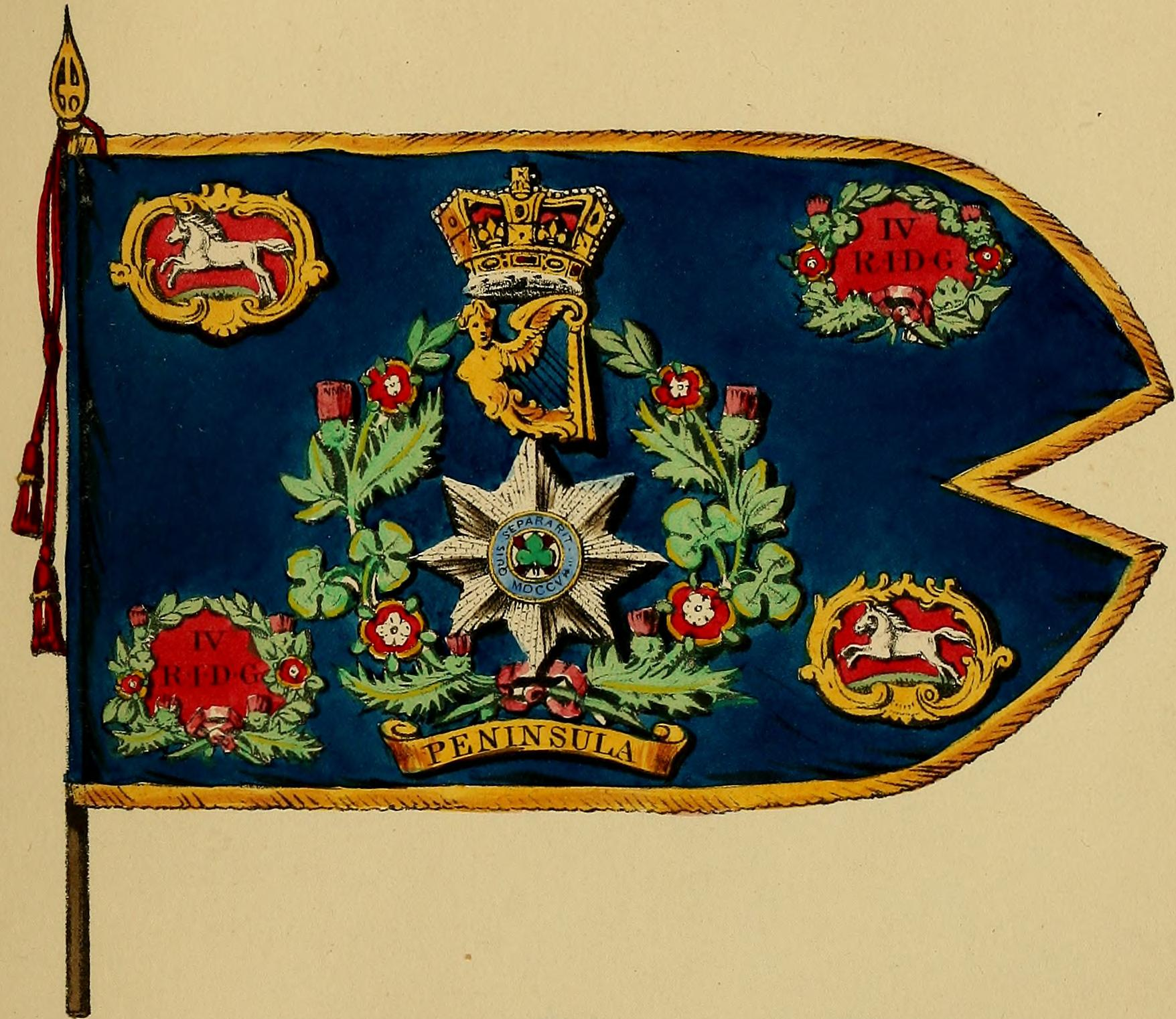
Regimental standard in 1839

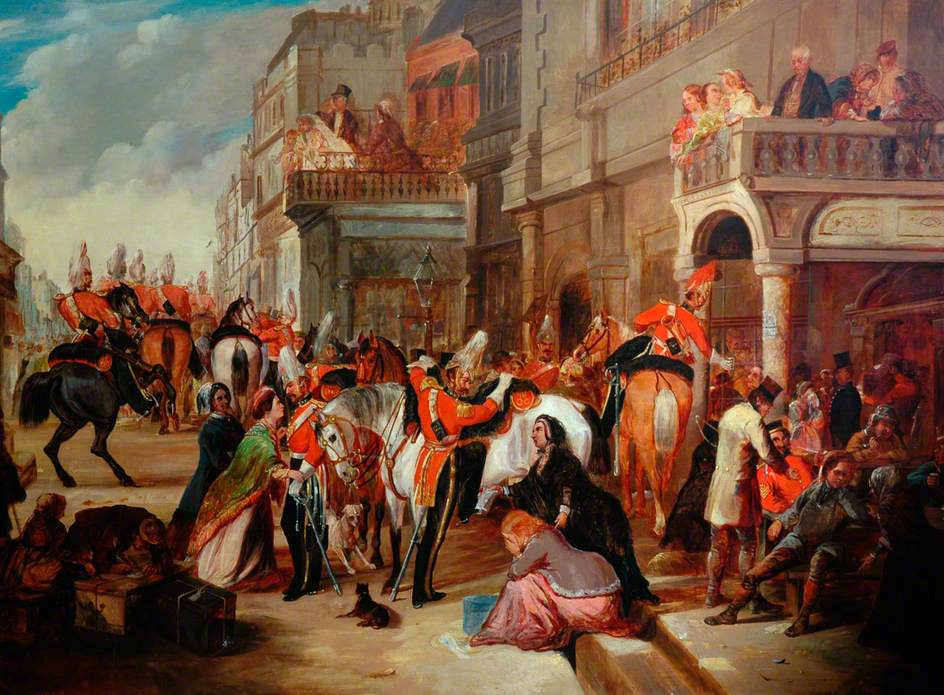
Painting of the regiment departing for the Crimea in 1856

The regiment was first raised by James, Earl of Arran, as the Earl of Arran's Regiment of Cuirassiers in 1685 as part of the response to the Monmouth Rebellion, by the regimenting of various independent troops, and was ranked as the 6th Regiment of Horse. It fought at the Battle of the Boyne in July 1690 and the Battle of Steenkerque in August 1692 during the Williamite War in Ireland. In 1691 it was re-ranked as the 5th Horse, and in 1746 transferred to the Irish establishment where it was the ranked 1st Horse. It returned to the British establishment in 1788, as the 4th (Royal Irish) Dragoon Guards.

The regiment was then involved in activities in support of the Invasion of France by émigrés in June 1795 before taking part in fighting at the Battle of Naas on 24 May 1798, the Battle of Prosperous also on 24 May 1798 and the Battle of Tuberneering on 4 June 1798 during the Irish Rebellion. At Tuberneering a troop from the regiment were ambushed and the troop commander, Lieutenant-Colonel Walpole and 100 of his men died. The regiment went on to fight at the Battle of Arklow on 9 June 1798 and the Battle of Vinegar Hill on 21 June 1798.

The regiment was deployed to the Peninsula in 1811 and fought under General Sir John Slade at the Siege of Ciudad Rodrigo in January 1812 during the Peninsular War. It also took part in the charge of the Heavy Brigade at the Battle of Balaclava in October 1854 during the Crimean War and in the Battle of Tel el-Kebir in September 1882 during the Anglo-Egyptian War.

Returning to the United Kingdom in late 1882, the regiment was back in Egypt (detachment to the Nile) from 1884 to 1885, then was posted to Ireland in 1886. It returned to England in 1891, and was posted to British India in 1894, where it was first stationed at Rawalpindi in Punjab, then from late 1902 in Muttra.

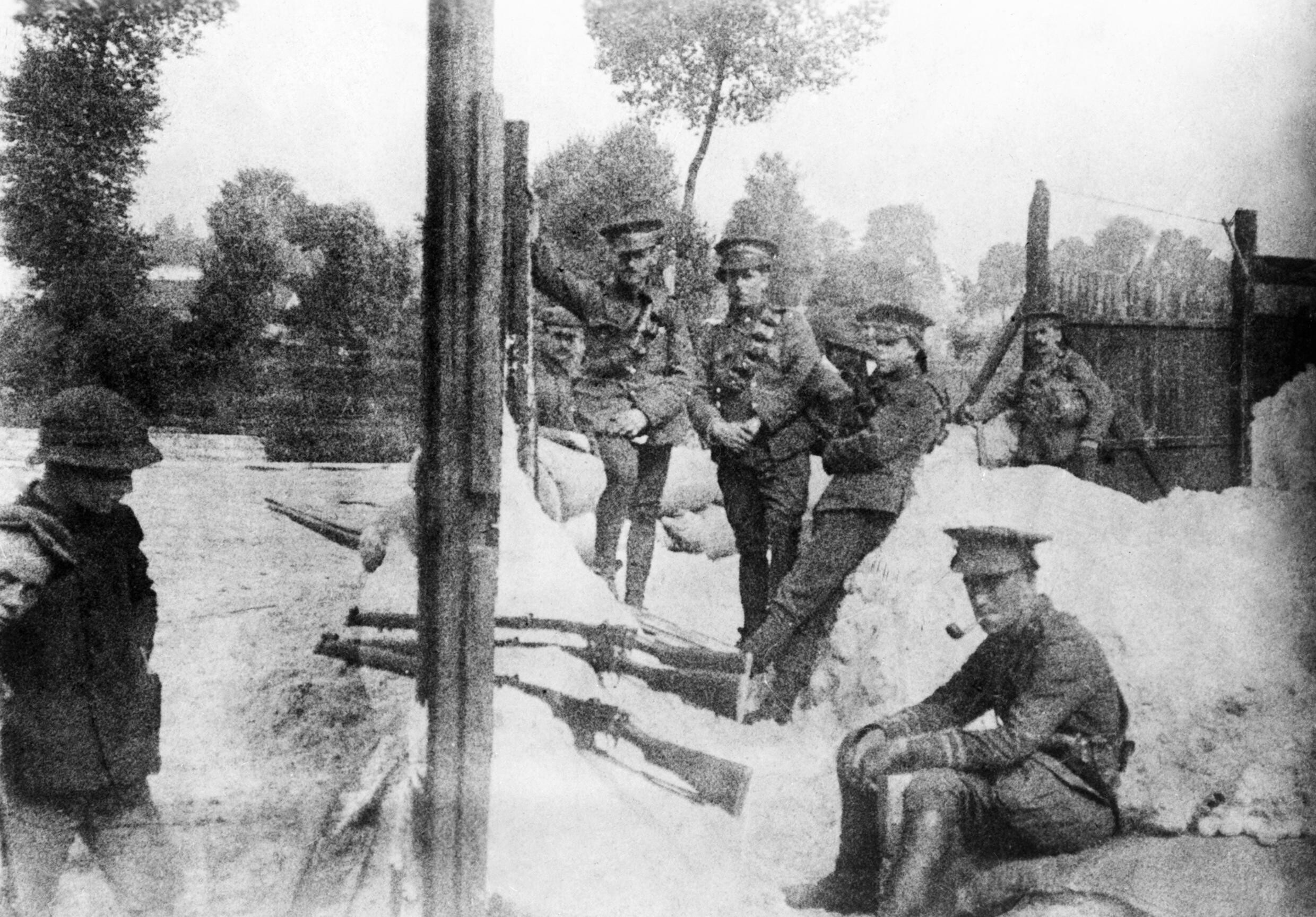
A defensive position built by the regiment near Mons, August 1914

The regiment landed in France at the outbreak of the First World War as part of the 2nd Cavalry Brigade in the 1st Cavalry Division on 16 August 1914 for service on the Western Front. Perhaps the regiment's most notable engagement was on 22 August 1914, when one of its squadrons became the first members of the British Expeditionary Force to engage the German army in the First World War. Two full troops of British cavalry surprised four patrolling German cavalrymen of the 2nd Kuirassiers at Casteau near Mons. After a brief pursuit the British cavalry killed most of the German patrol. Captain Charles Hornby was reputed to have become the first British soldier to kill a German soldier, using his sword, and Drummer Edward Thomas is reputed to have fired the first British shots of the war.

In 1921 the regiment was renamed the 4th Royal Irish Dragoon Guards. In 1922 it was amalgamated with 7th Dragoon Guards (Princess Royal's) to form the 4th/7th Dragoon Guards.

== Regimental museum ==
The regimental collection is held in the York Army Museum at the Tower Street drill hall in York.

== Battle honours ==
The regiment's battle honours were as follows:

- Early Wars: Peninsular, Balaklava, Sevastopol, Tel-el-Kebir, Egypt 1882
- The Great War: Mons, Le Cateau, Retreat from Mons, Marne 1914, Aisne 1914, La Bassée 1914, Messines 1914, Armentières 1914, Ypres 1914 '15, St. Julien, Frezenberg, Bellewaarde, Somme 1916 '18, Flers-Courcelette, Arras 1917, Scarpe 1917, Cambrai 1917 '18, St. Quentin, Rosières, Amiens, Albert 1918, Hindenburg Line, Pursuit to Mons, France and Flanders 1914-18

== Colonels ==
The colonels of the regiment were as follows:

Earl of Arran's Cuirassiers and 6th Regiment of Horse

- 1685-1688 Lieutenant-General James, Earl of Arran later Duke of Hamilton KG KT. app. 28 July 1685 —The Earl of Arran’s Horse
- 1688-1688 Colonel Charles, Earl of Selkirk. app. 20 November 1688 —The Earl of Selkirk’s Horse
- 1688-1693 Colonel Charles Godfrey. app. 31 December 1688

from 1691 5th Regiment of Horse

- 1693-1713 Lieutenant-General Francis Langston. app. 7 March 1693 — Langton’s Horse
- 1713-1715 Lieutenant-General George Jocelyn. app. 29 October 1713 —Jocelyn’s Horse
- 1715-1729 Major-General Sherrington Davenport. app. 9 February 1715 — Davenport’s Horse (also The Prince of Wales’s Own Regiment of Horse)
- 1729-1732 Lieutenant-General Owen Wynne. app. 6 July 1729 — Wynne’s Horse
- 1732-1739 Lieutenant-General Thomas Pearce. app. 29 September 1732 — Pearce’s Horse
- 1739-1743 Field Marshal James, Baron Kilmaine. app. 26 August 1739 — Trawley’s Horse
- 1743-1762 Lieutenant-General John Brown. app. 1 April 1743 — John Brown’s Horse

from 1746 1st (Irish) Regiment of Horse and 4th Dragoon Guards or 1st Horse (Irish Establishment) or Blue Horse

in the Irish establishment (from the British establishment)

On 1 July 1751 a royal warrant provided that in future regiments would not be known by their colonels' names, but by their "number or rank".

- 1762-1775 General James Johnston (Johnston of the Blues). app. 3 August 1762
- 1775-1778 General James Johnston (Irish Johnston). app. 27 April 1775
- 1778-1803 General George Warde. app. 1 April 1778

from 1788 4th (Royal Irish) Dragoon Guards

in the British establishment (from the Irish establishment)

- 1803–1814 Lieutenant-General Miles Staveley
- 1814–1827 General Sir Henry Fane, GCB
- 1827–1849 General Sir George Anson, GCB
- 1849–1868 General Richard Pigot
- 1868–1874 General Sir James Charles Chatterton, 3rd Baronet, GCB, KH
- 1874–1894 General Sir Edward Cooper Hodge, GCB
- 1894–1896 Lieutenant-General William Godfrey Dunham Massy, CB
- 1896–1908 Lieutenant-General Sir Henry Clement Wilkinson, KCB
- 1908–1922 Lieutenant-General Sir Edward Cecil Bethune, KCB, CVO

from 1921 4th Royal Irish Dragoon Guards

In 1922 the regiment was amalgamated with the 7th Dragoon Guards (Princess Royal's) to form the 4th/7th Royal Dragoon Guards.

== See also ==
- British cavalry during the First World War

== Bibliography ==
- Brereton, JM (1985). A Guide to the Regiments and Corps of the British Army on the Regular Establishment. London: The Bodley Head. pp. 33–34. ISBN 0-370-30578-7.
